= Talysh National Movement =

Talysh National Movement Tolışi Milli Hərəkot
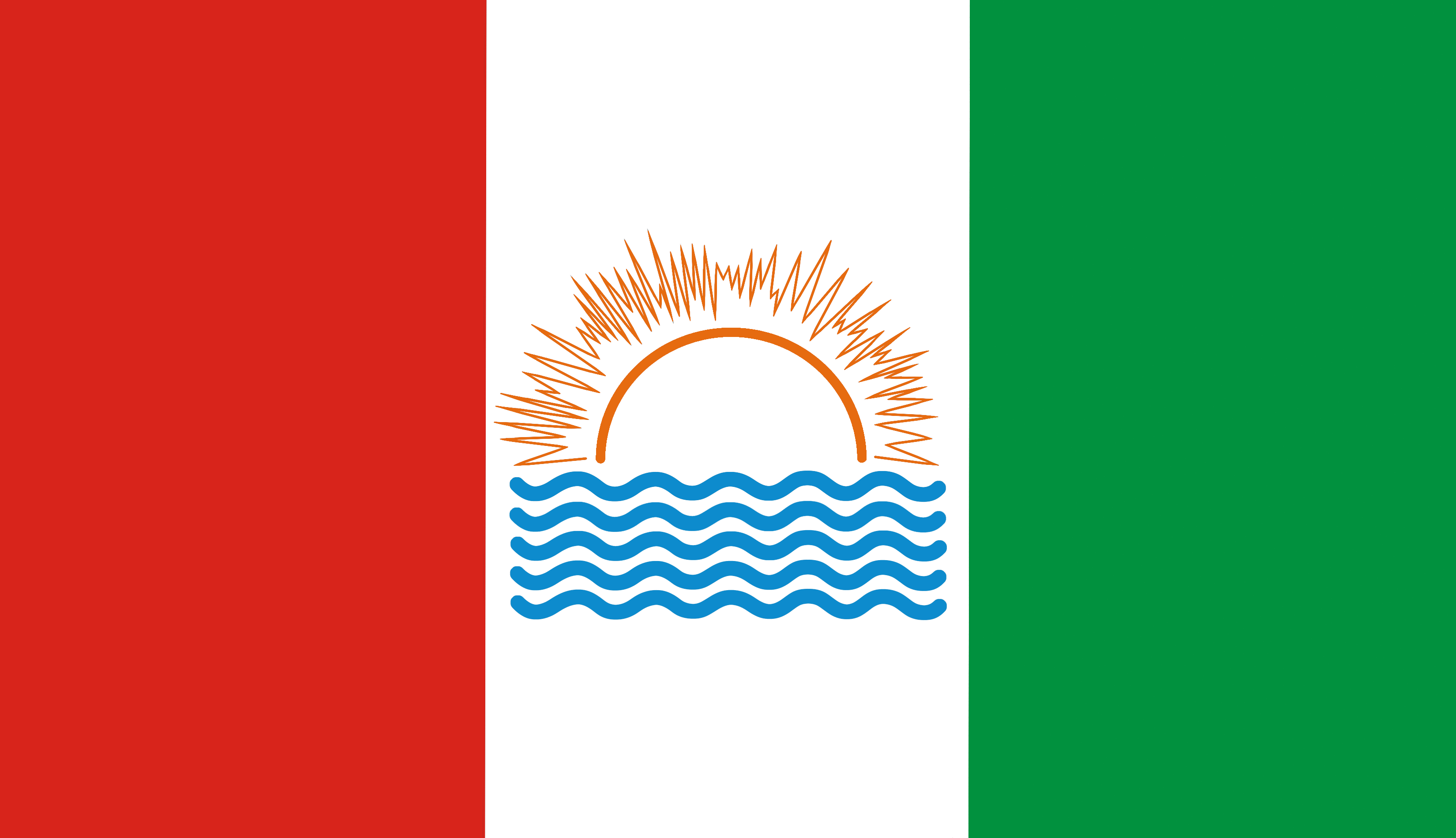
- Flag of the Talysh National Movement in the UNPO
- Abbreviation: TMH
- Founder: Alikram Hummatov
- Founded: 2007
- Headquarters: The Hague, Netherlands
- Ideology: Talysh minority interests Autonomism

The Talysh National Movement is a Talysh movement founded in 2007 in the Netherlands. Many of the movement's members previously participated in the formation of the Talysh-Mughan Autonomous Republic in 1993, including board member Alikram Hummatov.

The Talysh National Movement joined the Unrepresented Nations and Peoples Organization (UNPO) on 26 June 2007. Its membership was terminated on 1 March 2008 and readmitted on 29 June 2014.

== History ==
In late August 1993, members of the Talysh-Mughan Autonomous Republic and military personnel associated with its President, Alikram Hummatov, were recalled from active duty then arrested and subjected to repression. Hummatov's relatives were also subjected to repression; his brothers and uncle were arrested and convicted of harboring a state criminal. Hummatov's wife managed to evade arrest, but their twelve-year-old son was tortured by police, his hands burned with cigarettes. Hummatov himself was arrested and sentenced to death, later commuted to life imprisonment. Under pressure from the Council of Europe, he was pardoned in 2004. Based in the Netherlands and other European countries, he and other refugees Talysh refugees are supporting the still-active Talysh movement in Azerbaijan.

A key figure in the movement was Fakhraddin Aboszoda, philosopher, scientist, and former chairman of the People's Majlis of the Talysh-Mughan Autonomous Republic. He emigrated to Russia in 1995, returned to Talish in 2005 and published a newspaper in Baku, and in 2008 was forced to emigrate to Russia again because persecution. In July 2018, Aboszoda was detained by Russian authorities and extradited to Azerbaijan in early 2019, where he was charged with anti-state activities. In reviewing the materials on which the conviction was based, Amnesty International concluded in its report, "Azerbaijan authorities must release Talysh activists", that none of these materials contained evidence of any crime recognized under international law or standards or contained any calls for violence. Calls for territorial secession are protected under international law, and Aboszoda exercised his right to freedom of expression in advocating his vision of an independent Talysh state.

In late 2003, Talysh activists founded the TolishPress news agency (www.TolishPress.org; originally www.TolishPress.com), which has since become the central media outlet of the Talysh National Movement. It covered both the movement's activities and other events in Talish.

Since 2007, the movement has been headed by Hummatov in the Netherlands, where part of the former leadership of the Talysh-Mughan Autonomous Republic lives in exile. The TNM advocates for the creation of a Talysh province with regional governance within the borders of Azerbaijan and demands decentralization of power to promote more equitable representation of minority groups and to guarantee cultural and linguistic freedoms.

In the second half of August 1993, members of the Talysh-Mugan Autonomous Republic and military personnel associated with TMAR President Hummatov were recalled from the front, then arrested and subjected to repression. Hummatov's relatives were also subjected to repression; his brothers and uncle were arrested and convicted of harboring a state criminal. Hummatov's wife evaded arrest for a long time. Hummatov's twelve-year-old son was tortured by police, his hands burned with cigarettes. Alakram was arrested and sentenced to death, later commuted to life imprisonment. Under pressure from the Council of Europe, he was pardoned in 2004. From the Netherlands and other European countries, he and other refugees from Talysh are trying to support the still-active national movement in Azerbaijan.

Since 2007, Alakram Hummatov has headed the Talysh National Movement (TNM) in the Netherlands, where some of the TMAR's Talysh leadership lives in exile. Specifically, the TNM advocates for the creation of a Talysh province with regional governance within the borders of Azerbaijan. The organization demands decentralization of power to promote more equitable representation of minority groups and guarantee cultural and linguistic freedoms.

On 19 February 2014, the UNPO and the Talysh National Movement held a conference at the European Parliament on "Minority Rights, Reconciliation, and Progress in Peace in the South Caucasus". Fakhraddin Aboszoda was one of the authors of Hummatov's report prepared for the conference. The conference discussed the Nagorno-Karabakh conflict and Talysh issues in Azerbaijan.

On 5 May 2015, the UNPO and the Talysh National Movement held another conference at the European Parliament, titled "Azerbaijan: Double Standards and the Violation of Minority Rights". The second part of the conference, entitled “Paths Forward: Civil Society Initiatives, Economic Development, and International Strategies”, focused on theoretical and practical options for protecting minority rights in Azerbaijan. Hummatov opened the second part by addressing the problems arising from the political centralization under President of Azerbaijan Ilham Aliyev. Hummatov stated that, although Azerbaijan is theoretically a democracy, it lacks a real separation of powers and its current political system leaves no room for dissent. In his view, a possible solution lies in political reforms and decentralization, which will give each region of the country the opportunity to change its social, cultural, and economic life in accordance with its needs and identity.

== Goals ==
The Talysh National Movement advocates for regional autonomy for Talish within Azerbaijan. This calls for decentralization of power to promote more equitable representation of minority groups and guarantee cultural and linguistic freedoms.

On 15 July 2018, a group of young activists, together with Alikram Hummatov, formed the government of the Talysh-Mughan Autonomous Republic in exile, largely based in the Netherlands. The government in exile sends letters and statements to international organizations, governments, and global human rights organizations to reflect the position of the Talysh people in Azerbaijan. It also calls on the Azerbaijani government to end discrimination against the Talysh people, demands that the Talysh language be taught in schools and that Talysh people be able to earn a living in their homeland rather than be forced to emigrate.

== Talysh issues ==
According to the UNPO website, like many other minorities in Azerbaijan, the Talysh people are subject to aggressive assimilation attempts. There is no formal education in the Talysh language, and reading and speaking it is discouraged by the authorities. Instead, the Talysh are encouraged to use Azerbaijani or Persian in formal circumstances. Consequently, the number of young people studying in Talysh is declining, as the language is currently classified as "vulnerable" by UNESCO.

Talysh activists who spoke out about the rights of the Talysh people, carried out humanitarian work, or held views contrary to the official authorities subjected to persecution. For example, the murders of the scientist Novruzali Mammadov and Fakhraddin Aboszoda in prison, the prison sentence of journalist Hilal Mammadov, the persecution of Atakhan Abilov and the arrest of Elvin Isaev.

The leaders of the Talysh National Movement are convinced that the current Azerbaijani authorities are continuing a policy of completely assimilating the Talysh people.

== See also ==
- Talish (region)
- Talish-i Gushtasbi
