= List of Talysh people =

This is a list of notable Talysh people.

== Historical figures ==
- Zahed Gilani (probably)
- Abdal Beg Talish
- Khadem Beg Talish
- Mirza Mohammad Talish
- Mohammad Beg Talish

== Modern figures ==
- Zeynal Zeynalov
- Zulfugar Ahmedzade (1898–1942)
- Nasirli Muzaffar (1902-1944)
- Hazi Aslanov (1910-1945)
- Mirsalaev Boyukaga
- Shirali Akhundov
- Alikram Hummatov
- Fakhraddin Aboszoda (1956–2020)
- Zardusht Alizadeh
- Atakhan Abilov
- Hootan Dolati
- Hilal Mammadov
- Novruzali Mammadov
- Allahshukur Pashazadeh
- Hooshang Amirahmadi
- Rovshan Janiyev
- Idrak Abbasov
- Tawhid Ibrahim Begli
- Mubariz Mansimov
- Panjali Teymurov

=== Centenarians ===
- Shirali Muslimov
- Mahmud Eyvazov
