= Persecution of Talysh people =

Since the Azerbaijan Republic gained independence from the Soviet Union, allegations have been made of the systematic persecution and detention of the Talysh people by the country's secret services. According to the Union for the Freedom of Political Prisoners of Azerbaijan, as of May 13, 2026, five Talysh activists and scholars are included in the organization's list: Aslan Gurbanov, Muhafiz Jafarzade, Ruslan Vahabov, Iqbal Abilov, and Zahiraddin Ibragimov.

== Persecution of Talysh activists ==
=== Talysh-Mugan Republic activists ===
Since the end of August 1993, about 20 people have been identified in Lankaran in connection with the so-called Talysh-Mugan Republic case, being declared separatists and having difficulty in securing lawyers for their defense. In reality, Talysh leader Alikram Hummatov did not demand secession from Azerbaijan. The slogan of Talysh autonomy was advanced, but the movement he led was primarily directed against Heydar Aliyev's rise to power and in support of Ayaz Mutalibov, whose name Surat Huseynov and others used during their march from Ganja to Baku in June 1993. A Committee for the Defense of Prisoners and Women's Rights was formed in Lankaran. A criminal case was opened against its head, Sudaba Rasulova, the wife of Alikram Hummatov. She was accused of illegally seizing the apartment her family had lived in since 1992 and which they had privatized. In the spring of 1995, Rasulova was arrested; during her arrest, she and her three children were beaten. After his wife's arrest, Alikram Hummatov, who was wanted by the police, surrendered to the authorities. Sudaba was released from custody and went into hiding. Also arrested were A. Hummatov's close relatives—Azad and Safayil Mamedov, Miri Dadashev, and his brothers, Nariman and Farman Hummatov. Hummatov's mother was taken in for interrogations at night. According to Baku residents, on August 16, Heydar Aliyev declared on Azerbaijani TV that the entire Hummatov family should be exterminated for sheltering him while the authorities were searching for him.

By a resolution of the Azerbaijani Parliament (August 16–17, 1993), the Supreme Court of the Republic suspended and banned the political activities of the Equality of Peoples of Azerbaijan Party (EPPA) (previously known as the Talysh People's Party - TPP), the leading party in the Talysh region, led by Hilal Mammadov, a PhD candidate in physics and mathematics. Until recently, almost all EPPA members were persecuted under various pretexts by central and local branches of the Azerbaijani Ministry of National Security.

After the arrest of A. Hummatov, 31 other activists were also convicted.

=== Novruzali Mammadov ===
Talysh linguist Novruzali Mamedov was arrested in Azerbaijan in 2007. Mamedov was also accused of collaborating with scholars from America, Canada, Great Britain, Germany, and Iran. The fact that these scholars wrote papers on the Talysh language was considered to be aiding foreign governments. Following Novruzali Mamedov, Elman Guliyev, editor of the newspaper Tolyshi Sado, was arrested.

=== Atakhan Abilov ===
Atakhan Abilov participated in defending the interests of convicted scientist Novruzali Mamedov, and after the trial, persecution began against him. According to Amnesty International, Atakhan Abilov, a Talysh activist, was allegedly detained by officers of the Azerbaijani Ministry of National Security. His apartment was also searched, and he was fired from his job at Baku State University due to his political views. Abilov frequently published in the newspaper "Tolyshi Sado" (Voice of the Talysh) and translated the Framework Convention for the Protection of National Minorities into Talysh. He subsequently left Azerbaijan for Russia in 2007.

=== Hilal Mammadov ===
On June 21, 2012, Hilal Mammadov was arrested in Baku by officers from the Ministry of Internal Affairs' Drug Abuse Control Department. Following his arrest, he was formally charged under Article 234 of the Criminal Code for possession of 33 grams of heroin, which were reportedly found on his person and in his home. On July 4, new charges were brought against him—under Articles 274 (high treason) and 283.2.2 (inciting national, racial, social, and religious hatred, enmity, and ethnic discrimination)—for his publications, public activities, and contacts with Talysh people living in Iran.

=== Fakhraddin Aboszoda ===
On February 27, 2019, Abbasov was brought to the Lyubertsy City Prosecutor's Office under the guise of being taken to the "Moscow Region Court." Under the supervision of five or six young men in civilian clothes, who identified themselves as "bailiffs," he was led through a back door into a conference room. There, the prosecutor presented the ruling of the Prosecutor General's Office of the Russian Federation. The ruling concluded with the following: "The Prosecutor General's Office of the Russian Federation refuses to extradite F. F. Abbasov to the Republic of Azerbaijan and releases him from custody." After reading the last sentence, Abbasov asked, "Why aren't my lawyers here? Please call them and invite them here!" Ultimately, Abbasov's lawyers were not summoned, and he was forcibly taken to the Lyubertsy District Court. Next, an officer from the Moscow Region Main Police Department's migration service reported that Abbasov had violated Russian migration law. Abbasov denied the charges and pointed out the absence of his lawyers. According to Abbasov, the officer already had a certificate of repatriation, which, in theory, requires a person to personally contact the Azerbaijani consulate and pay the required fee.

=== Elvin Isaev ===
While in Russia, Isayev actively maintained a video blog, criticizing Azerbaijan's political leadership and raising issues of corruption. His activities attracted the attention of authorities in both countries. In September 2019, the St. Petersburg City Court overturned Isayev's deportation to Azerbaijan.

=== Igbal Abilov ===
On June 22, 2024, State Security Service officers arrived Abilov and interrogated him at Masalli District State Security Service Department the for six hours. On June 27, when he attempted to fly from Baku to Bucharest (en route to Belarus), he was prevented from boarding the plane, with his passport and two phones confiscated. On July 22, Abilov was summoned again to the Masalli District State Security Service Department under the pretext of returning his passport and phones. However, without notifying his family, Abilov was taken to Baku.

On May 20, 2025, an Azerbaijani court sentenced Igbal Abilov to 18 years in prison for treason.

=== Zahiraddin Ibragimov ===
Talysh historian and activist Zakhiraddin Ibragimov disappeared in Yekaterinburg on March 26. A few days later, he was found in custody in Azerbaijan on charges of treason.
