= Talysh People's Party =

Talysh People's Party Talysh People's Party
- Leader: Hilal Mammadov
- Founders: Hilal Mammadov
- Founded: 1991
- Banned: 1993
- Ideology: Equality; Talysh nationalism

The Talysh People's Party (Talysh: Tolyšə Xəlği Partijə, Azerbaijani: Talış Xalq Partiyası) —political party of the Talysh people, founded in 1991 in Azerbaijan.

== Formation ==
The Talysh People's Party (TPP) was created on the basis of the "Party of Talysh National Revival", created in 1989. The goal of the "Party of Talysh National Revival" was to protect the rights of Talysh as a nationality and, in the long term, to fight for the creation of a constitutionally recognized Talysh Autonomous Republic.The historical justification for such a demand was the existence of the Talysh Khanate with its capital in Lankaran from 1736 until its annexation to the Russian Empire after the war with Persia.

In the fall of 1991, the "Party of Talysh National Revival" was reorganized into the "Talysh People's Party", and in July 1992 its founding congress was held. Hilal Mammadov, a scientist from the Azerbaijan Academy of Sciences, who spoke at the congress, was elected chairman of the party. Party leaders emphasized that they support the territorial integrity of Azerbaijan and consider the future development of the Talysh people only in the context of the Azerbaijani state. Since the Azerbaijani authorities refused to register the party under the name Talysh People's Party, it was renamed the Party of Equality of the Peoples of Azerbaijan. Its main support was the intellectual-student environment. By the middle of 1993, this party had 5 thousand members. The second (extraordinary) congress took place on March 28, 1993, in Lankaran.

== Views and goals of political party ==
- Advocacy for equal political, economic, social and cultural rights and freedoms of all peoples living in the republic - Turks, Talysh, Lezghins, Kurds, Tats, Russians, without bias towards any of them.
- The duty to protect the interests of all peoples and the territorial integrity of the republic, to further strengthen friendship and friendly relations and, for this purpose, to eliminate the reasons that can lead to confrontation between peoples in the republic.
- Support for ideas: 1) Azerbaijanism (patriotism), 2) ethnic equality; 3) democracy. Waging an uncompromising struggle against double standards for various ethnic groups, against ethnic exclusivity, ethnic superiority and aggravation of interethnic hostility.
- The main tasks of the party include reviving the process of creating a sense of national identity; political, economic, social and cultural progress of the peoples of the republic; and preservation, study and development of their traditions, folklore, history and native language.
- Talysh People's Party is a parliamentary type party. Its activities are carried out on the basis of international law, the principle of self-determination of peoples, the current republican legislation and its own rules and programs. He fights by democratic parliamentary means for political power and for equal participation of all peoples of the republic in the legislative body of Azerbaijan.
- In its activities, the party is guided by the Constitution of the Republic of Azerbaijan and the Universal Declaration of Human Rights.

== Banning the political party ==
In June 1993, on the territory of seven districts in the south of the country (Astara, Lankaran, Lerik, Yardimli, Masalli, Calilabad, Bilasuvar districts), the Talysh-Mugan Autonomous Republic (TMAR) headed by Alakram Hummatov was formed. On August 24, 1993, the leadership of Azerbaijan transferred additional troops to the Talysh regions, the leaders of the TMAR were taken into custody, and the Talish People's Party (Party of Equality of the Peoples of Azerbaijan) was disbanded. Although there was no obvious connection between the uprising and the Talysh People's Party, in October 1993 it was outlawed.

In Lankaran, rallies began in support of Hummatov and his supporters, pickets were held with the demand: to release Gummatov, Talysh poet Ali Nasir and all those arrested in connection with the events of that time; stop the persecution of the "Talysh People's Party" ("Party of the Equality of the Peoples of Azerbaijan"), which at that time already had five thousand members; the local population also demanded to suspend military mobilization in Talysh regions.

A continuation of the party's ideas was the creation of the Talysh National Movement (TNM) in the Netherlands, where part of the Talysh leadership of the TMAR lives in exile. In particular, the TNM advocates the creation of a Talysh province with regional administration within the borders of Azerbaijan. Demands decentralization of power in order to promote fairer representation of minority groups, as well as to guarantee cultural and linguistic freedoms.
