= Talış =

Talış, T’alish or Talish may refer to:

- Talış, Agsu, Azerbaijan
- Talış, Hajigabul, Azerbaijan
- Talış, Ismailli, Azerbaijan
- Talış, Quba, Azerbaijan
- Talış, Shamkir, Azerbaijan
- Talış, Tartar, Azerbaijan

== See also ==
- Talesh (disambiguation)
- Talish (disambiguation)
- Talysh (disambiguation)
