= Talish =

Talish or Talish-i may refer to:

- Talish (region)
- Talish people
- Talish language
- Talish-i Gushtasbi, Azerbaijan
- Aruch, (until 1970 Talish), a village in Armenia
- Talish, Tartar, village in Nagorno-Karabakh

== Surname ==
- Agha Talish, a Pakistani actor
  - Aehsun Talish (son)
  - Raza Talish (grandson)

== See also ==
- Talesh (disambiguation)
- Talış (disambiguation)
- Talysh (disambiguation)
