= Talysh =

Talysh may refer to:

- Talysh people, an ethnic group of Iran and Azerbaijan
  - Talysh language, the West Iranian language of these people
  - Talysh (region), a historical region on the southwestern coast of the Caspian Sea, inhabited by the Talysh people
- Talysh Mountains, mountain range in Azerbaijan and Iran
- Talysh Khanate, in existence from 1747 to 1828
- Talysh-Mughan Autonomous Republic, a self-declared autonomy, which existed briefly in the south of Azerbaijan in 1993

== See also ==
- Talesh (disambiguation)
- Talış (disambiguation)
- Talish (disambiguation)
