= Fakhraddin Aboszoda =

Fakhraddin Aboszoda (Note: Also known as Fakhraddin Abbasov (Azerbaijani: Fəxrəddin Abbasov).) (Talysh: Фәхрәддин Әбосзодә; 1956 – 2020) was a Talysh rights activist and historian. He was a leader of the Talysh national movement. He was a chairman of the majlis (parliament) of the Talysh-Mughan Autonomous Republic within the Republic of Azerbaijan.

After the creation of the Talysh-Mughan Autonomous Republic, Aboszoda joined the Talysh movement. He took a central role in leadership after Alikram Hummatov asked him to write the Republic's constitution. He helped create its majlis, first convened in August 1993, and later became its chairman. The first orders of the majlis were to transfer military power to civilian authorities, officially declare the autonomous Talysh-Mughan republic as a constituent part of Azerbaijan, the election of Hummatov as president and the appointment of Aboszoda as head of the majlis.

After the end of the republic Aboszoda became an editor of Tolyshi Sado (1993–1995) and other Talysh newspapers, such as Tolysh and Shavnysht. He published a series of Talysh-Russian and Talysh-English dictionaries, the first since Novruzali Mammadov's Talysh-Russian-Azerbaijani dictionary in 2006.

== Arrest, imprisonment and death ==
Aboszoda first fled Azerbaijan in 1995, fearing arrest for his involvement in the autonomous republic. Like other Talysh figures, he returned in 2005, but left again in 2007 after renewed repression of Talysh activists featuring the arrest of Novruzali Mamedov. He lived in Russia before his arrest.

In 2018, Republic of Azerbaijan formally petitioned the Russian government to arrest and deport Aboszoda to Azerbaijan on the grounds that "he had threatened Azerbaijan's territorial integrity and incited ethnic hostility". In September 2018, Aboszoda was detained by Russian authorities. He was deported to Azerbaijan in February 2019, in spite of a pending asylum application. Immediately arrested upon his arrival in Baku, nearly a year later (in February 2020), he was sentenced to 16 years in prison, convicted of "public appeals against the state, inciting ethnic hatred, and treason".

When studying the evidence, international human rights organization Amnesty International, in its report "Azerbaijan authorities must release Talysh activists", concluded that none of the evidence contained evidence of any recognized crimes in accordance with international law and standards, or any incitement to acts of violence. Calls for secession are protected by international law, and Abbasov exercised his right to freedom of expression in upholding his vision of an independent Talysh state.

He died in prison in 2020. The Azerbaijani authorities declared it a suicide, although shortly before his death, Aboszoda had released a statement that his life was in danger.

== Sources ==
- Goff, Krista A. (2021). Nested Nationalism: Making and Unmaking Nations in the Soviet Caucasus. Ithaca, NY: Facts on File. ISBN 978-1-5017-5327-5.
- Kitachayev, Bashir (May 25, 2023). Hart, Eilish (ed.). "'A suicide mission' Anti-war activists explain the challenges of protesting in Azerbaijan". Meduza.
