= Talyshstan =

Talyshstan, Talishstan or Talyshistan may refer to:

- Talish, a historical region on the southwestern coast of the Caspian Sea, inhabited by the Talysh people
- Talysh-Mughan Autonomous Republic, a self-proclaimed autonomous republic within Azerbaijan (1993)
