= Zahiraddin Ibrahimov =

Zahireddin Ibragimov (Talysh: Zahirəddin Ibragimov; 1954) a human rights activist and oppositionist of Talysh origin.

== Biography ==
After finishing high school, he graduated from the Lankaran Pedagogical College and then the history department of the Azerbaijan State University. He worked as a history teacher in the village of Shaglaser. After Gorbachev's "perestroika" he became involved in social and political activities.

In 1997, he moved to Russia, to Yekaterinburg, and in 2002 he received Russian citizenship. And in 2012, he became one of the founders of the "Talysh Cultural Center". Later, he repeatedly took part in international Talysh conferences that were held in Armenia. In 2007, Ibragimov officially renounced his Azerbaijani citizenship.

== Extradition ==
The chairman of the committee for the protection of the rights of ethnic minorities and supporter of the autonomy of the Talysh people, Zahireddin Ibragimov, disappeared on March 26, 2025 after leaving his apartment in Yekaterinburg.

Subsequently, Azerbaijani media reported that the country's special services had carried out a special operation and that Ibrahimov was in a Baku prison under investigation. The State Security Service (SSS) of Azerbaijan brought a whole range of charges against Ibrahimov, from treason to inciting ethnic hatred and separatism, and undermining the territorial integrity of the country. According to Zakharova, Ibragimov retained his Azerbaijani citizenship, but was deprived of his Russian citizenship for the illegal actions he committed.
