= Elvin Isaev =

- Эльвин Исаев
- Born: October 21, 1980 (age 45)

Elvin Isaev Iltiham Oglu (Russian: Эльвин Исаев; born October 21, 1980) is a Talysh opposition political blogger and activist.

== Biography ==
Elvin Isaev was born on October 21, 1980. He moved to Russia in 1998, was granted Russian citizenship in 2001. In August 2019, he was stripped of Russia citizenship.

== Political activity and deportation ==
While in Russia, Isaev actively maintained a video blog, criticizing Azerbaijan's political leadership and raising issues of corruption. His activities attracted the attention of authorities in both countries. In September 2019, the Saint Petersburg City Court overturned Isaev's deportation to Azerbaijan, after Isaev's lawyers invoked Rule 39 of the ECHR, which prohibits the forced expulsion of a person if they face danger or political persecution in their home country. After his release from a temporary detention center for foreign citizens in Russia, Isaev traveled to Ukraine on his own using an Azerbaijani passport.

== Arrest and trial ==
On the morning of December 12, 2019, Elvin Isaev disappeared in Kyiv. The blogger and political activist had been staying in the Svyatoshinsky district with friends. That day, Ukrainian authorities deported Isaev to Azerbaijan. On December 14, the parliament's migration service issued a press release regarding Elvina Isaeva's detention.

Upon arrival in Azerbaijan, Isaev was immediately arrested on charges of illegal possession of weapons. Human rights activists believe that the criminal case was fabricated and that his prosecution is politically motivated, related to his criticism of the government.

The head of the Kharkiv human rights group, Yevgeny Zakharov, said that Isaev approached them in Ukraine, but refused to apply for asylum in that country. "He wanted to get to some Western country and asked for help with this." Elvin Isaev is being held in the Kurdakhani prison.

== Persecution of his relatives ==
Elvin's brother, Russian citizen Kamal Isaev, was detained in Turkey and brought to Baku by Azerbaijan's State Security Service. According to preliminary reports, he was charged with "crimes against the state." His family claimed the arrest was related to Isaev's statements in defense of the rights of the Talysh people.
