= Talish-i Gushtasbi =

Historical region of the Republic of Azerbaijan

Talish-i Gushtasbi (Persian: تالش گشتاسبی) is the historical name of the northern Talish area, presently a part of the Republic of Azerbaijan. During the Abbasid Caliphate, there was a (partially equivalent) region called Gushtasfi (Persian: گشتاسفی). People of northern Talysh are of Iranian stock and speak a northwestern Iranian language called Talysh. The chief cities of the mentioned area are Lankaran, Lerik, Masally and Astara. Talysh language speaking people lives mainly in Astara (most of population), Lerik (great part of population), Lankaran (little more than half of population), and in Masally constitutes only small part of population.

== See also ==
- Talish (region)
- Talysh-Mughan Autonomous Republic
- The National Talysh Movement
- Storming of Lankaran
