= Talysh Pedagogical College =

Educational institution for training personnel for Talysh schools

Talysh Pedagogical College is an educational institution for training personnel for Talysh schools, teaching in the Talysh language, located in the city of Lankaran, Azerbaijan.

== History ==
Since the 1920s, a period of indigenization policy, the creation and development of social and cultural institutions for the Talysh began. In order to eliminate illiteracy among the Talysh, in 1928, an alphabet for the Talysh language was created based on the Latin alphabet. During this period, schools in the Talysh language were opened, and the Talysh Pedagogical College was organized in the city of Lankaran. Textbooks for incomplete secondary education up to the 6th grade of Talysh schools were written. In the period 1930-1938, many translations of fiction were published in the Talysh language, and the Talysh language was also studied by Azerbaijani linguists.

In 1933, there were 27 pedagogical technical schools in the Azerbaijan SSR, nine of which taught in the languages of national minorities, including the Talysh Pedagogical Technical School in Lankaran. The role of this educational institution in the formation of the Talysh intelligentsia is invaluable. The Lankaran Talysh Pedagogical Technical School was established in September 1924 under the name "Darulmuallimeyn". The first director was Teymur Shirali oglu Shakhverdiyev. In 1930-1931, this position was held by the Talysh poet and public figure Zulfugar Akhmedzade.

In the first academic year, 40 children studied at the school. The curriculum included native language, literature, Russian language, pedagogy, physics, chemistry, nature, geography, history, music, social education and other subjects. The first graduation of the school took place in 1929.

The activities of the pedagogical college covered several districts with compact residence of Talysh: Lenkoran, Masalli, Astara, Vergyaduz (Yardymlin), Zuvand (Lerik) districts. Teaching was conducted in Talysh and Azerbaijani languages. The college had 9 groups (in terms of the number of groups, the college was second only to Baku (23 groups) and Ganja (21 technical college groups).

In the 1935-1936 academic year, 3 more Talysh groups were opened in the technical school and the number of students reached 245. A certain number of Talysh also studied in other pedagogical technical schools in Azerbaijan.

The process of forming representatives of the Talysh intelligentsia continued until 1937, the year of terrible repressions. It was followed by the decree of 1938 on the inclusion of the Russian language as a compulsory subject in the curriculum. Teaching in Talysh in secondary schools and in the Talysh Pedagogical College was stopped. As a result of the oppression, Talysh students began to register as "Azerbaijanis". As a result, in 1938, according to statistics, 3 Talysh were studying in universities of the Azerbaijan SSR, and in the following years this figure dropped to zero.

In 1940, the technical school was closed and turned into a military hospital. The school's students completed their education in Baku, Shusha, Salyan and other pedagogical technical schools. After the war, the technical school in Lankaran was restored.
