= Talesh =

Talesh may refer to:

- Talesh County, in Gilan Province, Iran
  - Talesh, Iran, a city and capital of the above county
- Talish (region)

== See also ==
- Talış (disambiguation)
- Talish (disambiguation)
- Talysh (disambiguation)
