= Blaband =

Bilabənd
- Municipality
- Location within Azerbaijan
- Coordinates: 38°44′19″N 48°25′51″E
- Country: Azerbaijan
- Rayon: Lerik

Population
  - Total: 766
- Time zone: UTC+4 (AZT)
  - Summer (DST): UTC+5 (AZT)

Bilabənd (also, Bilaband, Blaband, and Balabant) is a village and municipality in the Lerik Rayon of Azerbaijan, in the Talysh region. It has a population of 766.
