= Talish (region) =

Region and former province on the Persia

Talish Tolyš
- Region
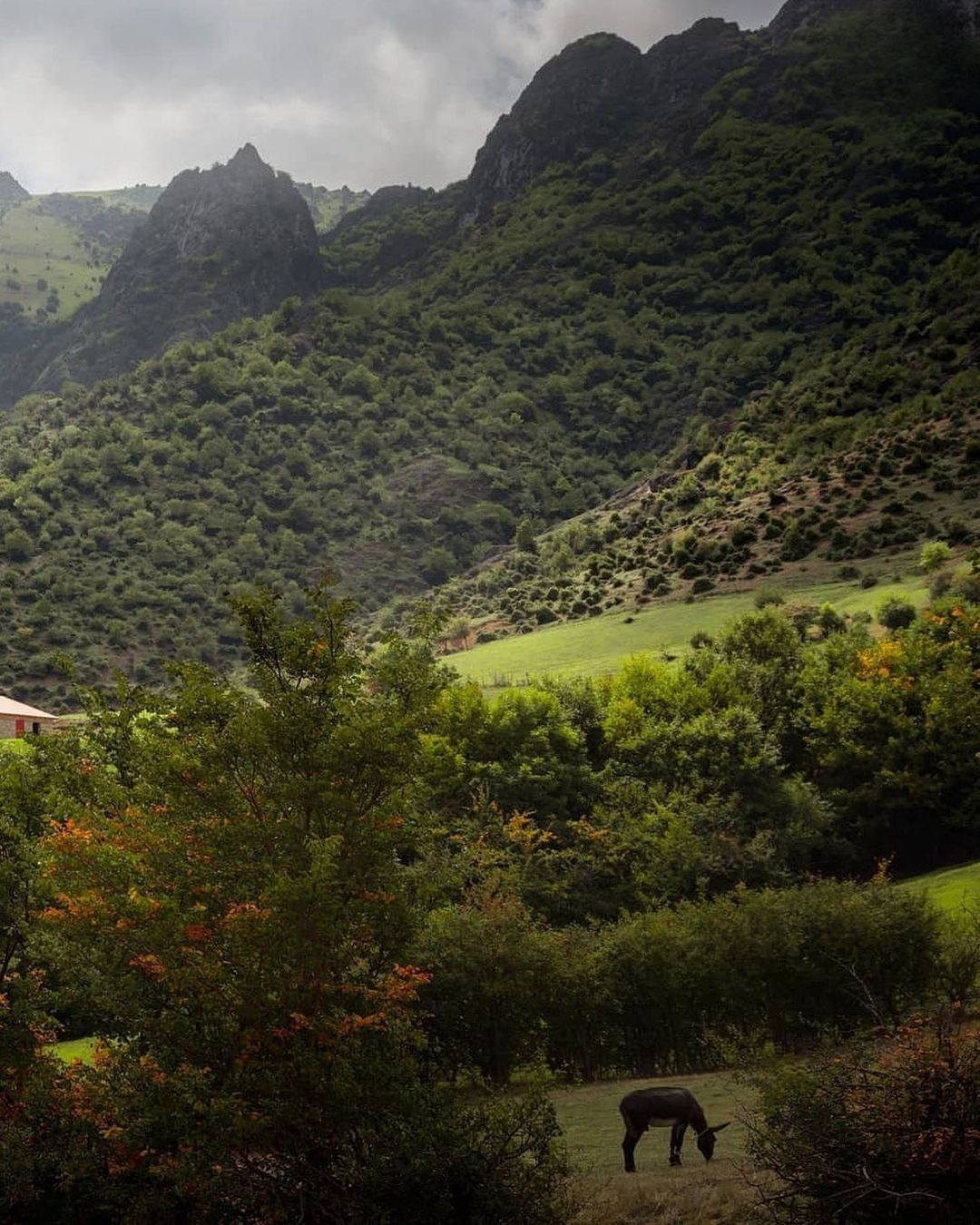
- Talysh Mountains, Lerik District
- Country: Iran; Azerbaijan
- Demonym: Talyshi

Time zones
- Iran: UTC+03:30 (IRST)
- Azerbaijan: UTC+04:00 (AZT)

Tālīsh (Note: Also written as Tolyš, Talysh and Talesh.) (Talysh: Tolyš; Azerbaijani: Talış; Persian: تالش, romanized: Tālesh) is a region in the southwestern coast of the Caspian Sea. It is a homeland of the indigenous Talysh people, who inhabit the region and speak the Talysh language. The territory and the language set apart Talish from its neighbors.

Talish is now divided between Azerbaijan and Iran. It stretches north from the Sefīd-Rūd river, which cuts through the Alborz mountains in Iran's Gilan province, to the Aras river in the south of the Republic of Azerbaijan.

The main city of the region and its Talysh people is Lankaran (Talysh: Lankon), the majority of the population of which is ethnically Talysh.

== Names and etymology ==
The name is first found in the Armenian translation of the Alexander Romance as "Tʿalis̲h̲". The Persian pronunciation of the name in plural form was "Talishan" (Persian: تالشان, romanized: Tāleshān).

The region is also known as Talyshistan and Talyshstan.

== History ==
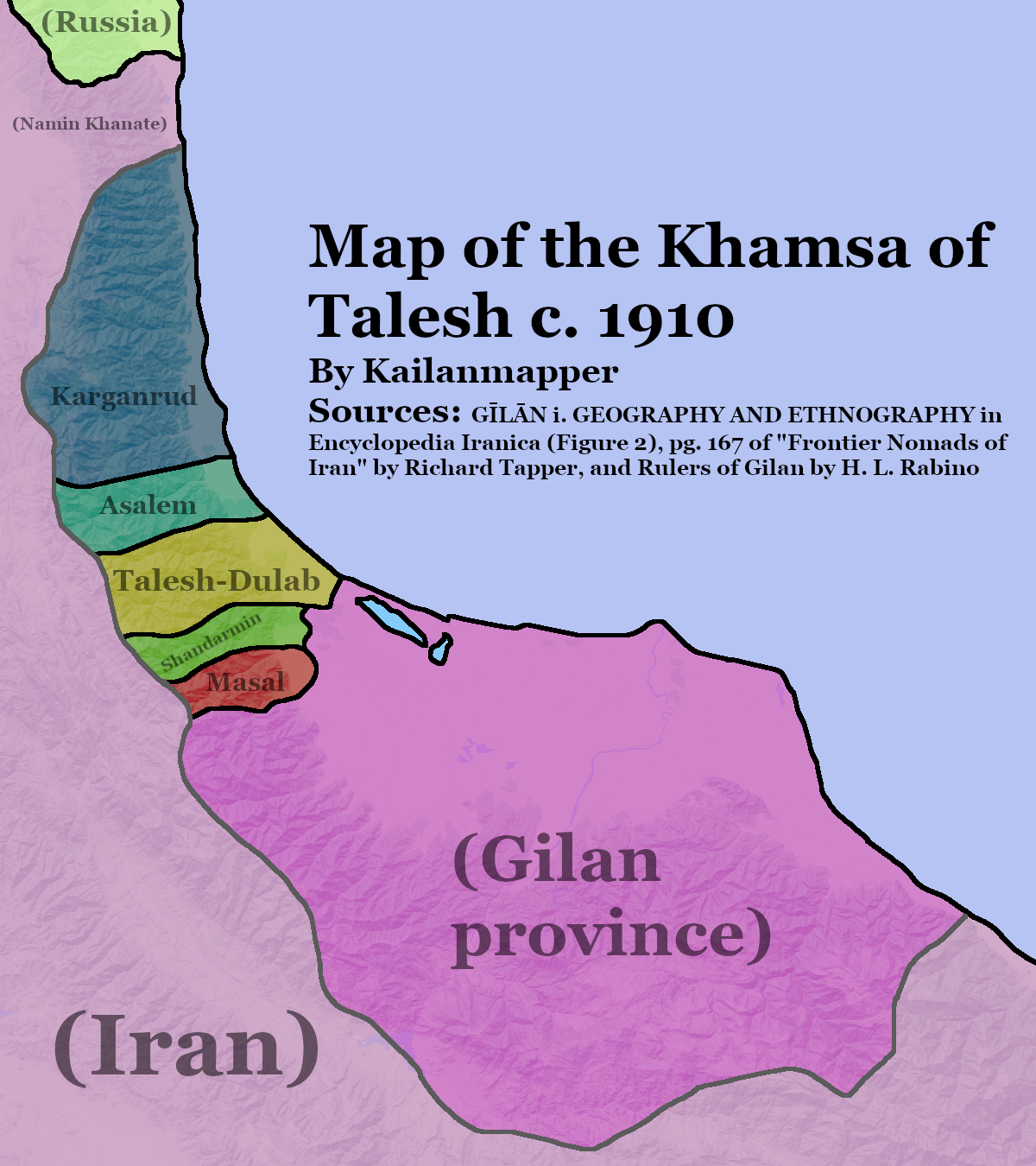
Map of the Khamsa of Talesh

In the Ilkhanate times, the Ispahbads of Gilan have had a principality on the borders of Gilan and Mughan, with a fortress and villages. In later times, a local Khan had his seat at Lankaran and was subject to the Persian monarchs. Peter the Great (r. 1682–1725), Emperor of Russia, first occupied the region during 1722–1732 and then it was returned to Safavid Persia. It was again occupied by Russia in 1796 and during the Russo-Persian War (1804–1813). In 1813 after the Storming of Lankaran most parts of the region were annexed by Russia and a smaller part remained within Persia. The Treaty of Gulistan of 24 October 1813, awarded to Russia the greater part of Talish, the part north of the Astara river. (Note: on the basis of the Status quo ad presentem) In the aftermath of the war, in order to weaken the power of Mir Mostafa Khan, Fath 'Ali Shah divided Persian Talish among 5 local families (Karganrud, Asalem, Talish-Dulab, Shandarmin, Masal) and created the Khamsa of Talish.

=== Antiquity ===
The earliest evidence of human presence in the region dates back to the Middle Paleolithic period, with findings near Masouleh and Buzeyir Cave. These include stone tools, such as Levallois cores, likely made by Neanderthals over 40,000 years ago. The Cadusii, an Iranian tribe, are generally assumed to settled the entire Talish region.

On the territory of Talish, especially its northern (Soviet) part, graves dating back to the second millennium BC were found.

=== Middle Ages ===
In medieval Arab historiography, the Talysh country was called al-Tailasan – the Arabic correspondence to the Persian "Talishan". Muhammad at-Tabari writes about the Talysh (calling them "Tailasan"): "In the mountains surrounding Aturpatakan there lived such peoples as the Gelae [and] Talysh, who did not obey the Arabs and retained their freedom and independence." According to the medieval Persian author Hamdalla Qazvini, the Tavalish region was located between the cities of Sultaniye and Ardabil (the name is the Arabic plural form of the word "Talish").

Although in the Middle Ages and Modern Times most of the people from Talish wrote in Persian, there is a whole group of poets who wrote in Talysh and the Gilani dialect close to it. The earliest Talysh poets include Seiyed Sharafshah Dulai, who lived in the 15th century.

=== Early modern period ===
Talish has traditionally been associated with either Gilan or Mughan, especially with Ardabil, the center of the latter, which appears to have shared a similar linguistic and ethnic bond with Talish prior to the Turkicization of Iranian Azerbaijan. This connection was still apparent during the time of the early Safavids, who were descended from Kurdish mystic Safi-ad-Din Ardabili (died 1334), a disciple of Zahed Gilani (died 1301), who was of probable Talysh descent. Two out of the four Sufi teachers of the first Safavid monarch Shah Ismail I (r. 1501–1524) carried the epithet "Talishi". Other figures with the same epithet served as governmental officials under the Safavids and their successors. Several Talysh chieftains were one of the first supporters of the Safavids, who gave them the governorship of Astara, which was part of the province of Azerbaijan. The governor of Astara was also known as the hakem (governor) of Talish, which indicates that Astara was the capital of the district. From 1539 and onwards the governorship of Astara was held hereditarily by the family of Bayandor Khan Talesh.

Talish was composed of various fiefs which would sometimes be granted to other emirs than the governor of Talish. For instance, Mohammad Khan Torkman was given control over a number of fiefs in Talish and Mughan in 1586. Later in 1684, Safiqoli Khan was one of the officers in control of Lankaran, and Hoseyn was another. Meanwhile, the unnamed governor of Talish lived in Ardabil. The Safavid shahs (kings) of Iran attempted to control local Talysh chiefs by subordinating them to obedient officials. Nevertheless, despite their centralization strategy, the Safavid administration was unable to terminate the local autonomy in the South Caucasus. Officially, the local chiefs were not hereditary lords, but officials whose rank were acknowledged by a royal farman (edict) which in reality was an acceptance of their local autonomy. The familial succession of the chiefs gave rise to dynasties that dominated local affairs and sought to consolidate their influence whenever the national government weakened.

During the decline of Safavid rule in the early 18th-century, Talysh leaders attempted to establish autonomous principalities. During the Russian invasion of Iran, the people of Talish volunteered to fight for the Safavid monarch Tahmasp II (r. 1722–1732). The latter was unable to provide them with military or material support; all he could do was give them an ineffective permit that allowed them to collect the taxes of Rasht. In 1723, Russians and Ottomans agreed to divide northern and western Iran between themselves. While the Caspian provinces were under Russian control, one of the local leaders Mir-Abbas Beg, who claimed to be a seyyed (descendant of the Islamic prophet Muhammad), worked together with the Russian commander Mikhail Matyushkin. By the end of 1735, the reconquest of northern and western Iran was completed, being led by the Iranian military leader Nader. It was also during this period that he set his sights on the throne, as he believed his campaigns had stabilised the country and brought him enough fame. On 8 March 1736, he was crowned the new shah of Iran, marking the start of the Afsharid dynasty.

==== Revolt of 1629 ====
In 1629, the Talysh peasants and the urban poor opposed Iranian rule and local feudal lords. The uprising, which began in the summer of 1629, soon spread to the surrounding area. About 30,000 people took part in the uprising. The Safavid ruler Shah Sefi sent troops against the rebels under the command of the ruler of Astara, Saru Khan of Talysh. In one battle, about 7,000 rebels were killed. The Talysh uprising, one of the strongest uprisings of the masses against the ruling class, was mercilessly suppressed.

==== Revolts in Gilan (1744–1747) ====
In 1744–1747, many uprisings broke out in Gilan. In 1744, uprisings began among the Talysh. Discontent was caused by the policy of Nadir Shah and the goal was to overthrow him. The movements began in the region of Astara and later covered the whole of Gilan. To extinguish the uprising of the Talysh, troops were sent to the region, which destroyed many of the rebellious villages and captured the instigators. But the rebels did not pacify and the unrest continued until 1746. The Talysh were not satisfied with the tax policy that robbed the population. At the head of the uprising was Kalb Hussein-bek, who declared disobedience to the supreme authority, who was supported and helped by the Talysh. To pacify Kalb Hussein-bek, Nadir Shah sends troops numbering 1.5 thousand soldiers, but the troops do not reach defeat. Further, Nadir Shah sends 3,000 Afghans against the rebels, but the Afghans cannot pacify the rebellion either. Then the military leaders try to promise forgiveness to the Talysh if they pacify. The policy of negotiations played a decisive role in pacifying the uprising, when the tribal elite went over to the side of the Shah. They helped the Shah's troops to decapitate the uprising by catching the Talysh village elders and punishing them. The headless movement died down and the uprisings ceased.

==== Talysh Khanate ====
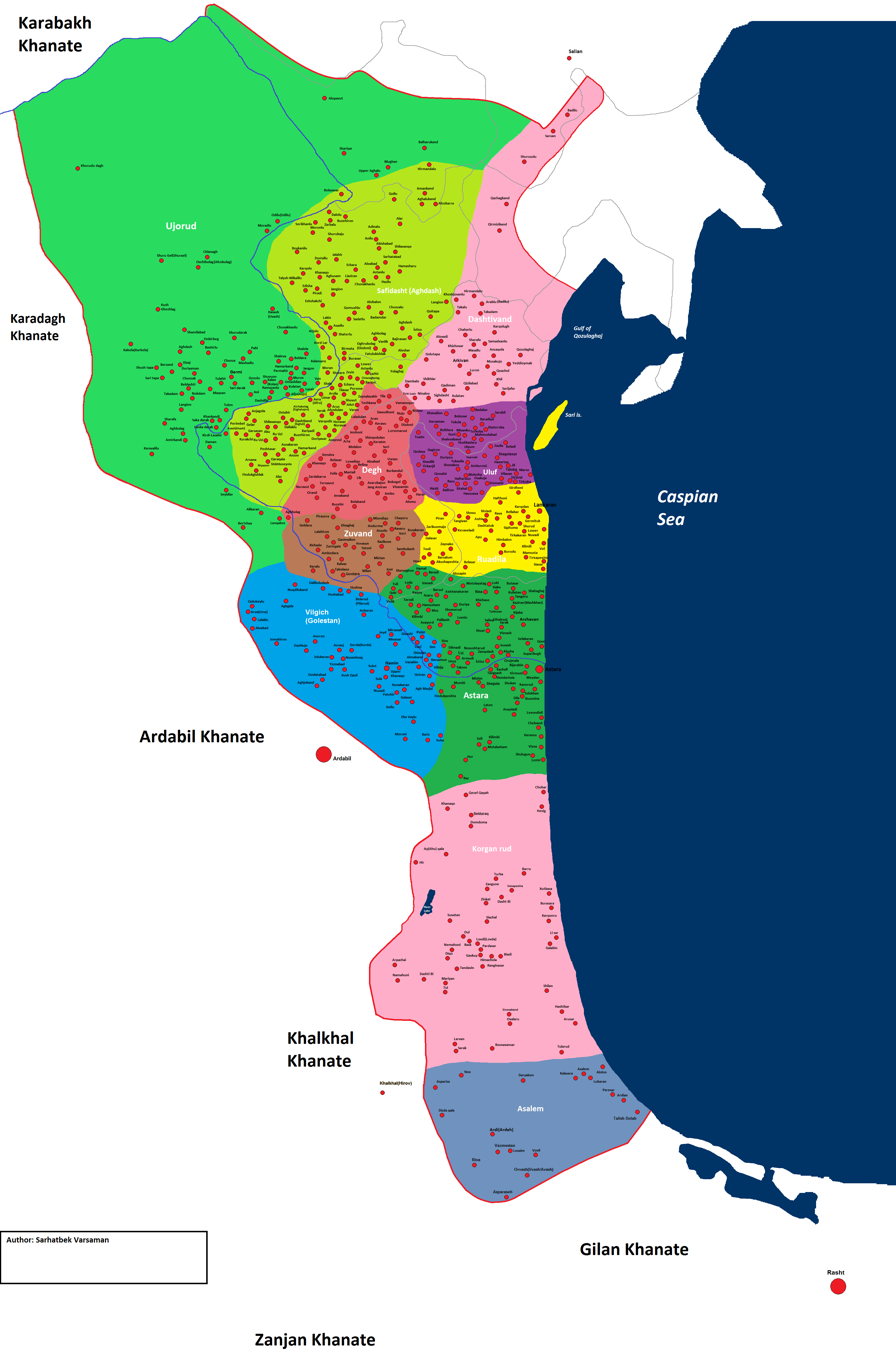
The Talysh Khanate (2nd half of the 18th century)

In the second half of the 18th to early 19th, the Talysh Khanate existed in the region. During the Russian-Persian war, the Talysh khan Mir Mustafa Khan took the side of Russia. In 1809, the Talysh Khanate became a Russian protectorate. In early August 1812, a 20,000-strong Persian army blockaded Lankaran and on August 9 captured the fortress. By the end of December, a Russian detachment under the command of General Pyotr Kotlyarevsky approached Lankaran, and on the night of January 1, 1813 began an assault on the fortress, which ended with the fall of the citadel. According to the treaty of Gulistan, such places as Kargara, Namin and Zuvand passed from the Talysh Khanate to Persia. However, the Persian court did not accept the loss of Transcaucasia and insistently demanded a revision of the borders. First of all, this concerned the border in Talysh, which was not defined at all in the Gulistan Treaty.

==== Partition of Talysh ====
In 1828, the Turkmanchay peace treaty was signed between Russia and Persia, which ended the next Russian-Persian war, according to which part of Zuvant was annexed to Talish, and most of Ujarri and part of the Astara magal (from the Astara River to Chilivan) went to Persia. In accordance with the order of General Ivan Paskevich, the chief governor of Georgia, dated May 2, 1828, the “Provisional Talysh administration” was established under the leadership of a chairman (manager) appointed from Russian military ranks. "Provisional Talysh gowerment" began to function on July 26, 1828. Until 1831 inclusive, it was directly subordinate to the chief governor in Georgia. But after the suppression of the uprising in March 1831 by the adherents of Mir-Hasan Khan, this "rule" was transferred to the jurisdiction of the military district chief of the Muslim provinces of the Transcaucasus in the city of Shusha (the so-called Administrator of Muslim provinces and the Talysh Khanate). And on the basis of the "Institution for the administration of the Transcaucasian region" dated April 10, 1840, the "Provisional Talysh government" was abolished. In the same period, the Caspian region was formed on the territory of Transcaucasia, which consisted of 7 counties, one of which was Talyshinsky county. Finally, in 1846, on the basis of the “Regulations on the Division of the Transcaucasian Territory” dated December 14, 1845, the Talyshinsky district was renamed into Lenkoransky and became part of the newly formed Shemakha (from 1859 – Baku) province of the Russian Empire. At the turn of the 20th century, there lived a famous Talysh poet – Safibaba Roshan-dehi.

=== Northern Talysh under Russian, Soviet and Azerbaijani rule ===
==== Russian revolution ====
In 1918, in the Talysh-Mugan region with its local Muslim and Russian population refused to submit to the newly formed Azerbaijan Republic. On August 4, 1918, the Provisional Military Dictatorship of Mughan was created, initially recognizing the authority of the Rostov government of General Denikin, then (at the end of the year) submitting to the "Caucasian-Caspian government" of the military foreman Bicherakhov in Petrovsk (Makhachkala).

On December 28, 1918, in Lankaran, the local Russian and Muslim population made a decision on the autonomy of the Mugan Territory within Russia with the parliament (Regional Council) and the government (Regional Administration). On April 24, the "white" government was overthrown and Soviet power was established, after which on May 15–18, 1919, at the congress of revolutionary Mugan in Lenkoran, the Mugan Soviet Republic was proclaimed as part of the RSFSR.

On May 18, 1919, the Congress elected the Mugan Regional Council of Workers 'and Peasants' Deputies, who in turn elected the Regional Executive Committee (executive committee) headed by the Bolsheviks. One of the active leaders of the partisan movement in Mugan, a prominent participant in the revolutionary uprising of Lankaran, David Danilovich Chirkin, was elected chairman of the Regional Council; the congress approved one of the workers of the Lenkoran branch of the cooperative society "Samopomich" – Shirali Akhundov from the Talysh village of Khavzava [7]. The Revolutionary Military Council was also elected, headed by the political commissar (I. Talikhadze) and the executive committee, headed by the pre-executive committee (N. Tutyshkin). On July 23–25, 1919, Lankaran was taken by Azerbaijani troops, and the Mugan Soviet Republic was liquidated. From that moment on, Lankaran was part of Azerbaijan.

==== Soviet period ====
In the 1920–1930s Talysh was taught in elementary schools, books were published in Talysh and there was a newspaper called "Red Talysh". The most prominent Talysh figure of that era was the poet and educator Zolfaghar Ahmedzadeh, the author, in addition to the original Talysh poetry, Talysh textbooks and translations into the Talysh language of Russian classics. In total, about 500 titles of books have been published in the Talysh language. However, in 1937 Zulfigar Akhmedzade was arrested, and the study of the Talysh language and publications in it were completely curtailed. The language was studied only in an academic environment and functioned at the everyday level. From then until the end of the Soviet period, Talysh identity was brutally suppressed. From 1959 to 1989, the Talysh were not included in any censuses as a separate ethnic group, but were considered part of the Azerbaijani Turks, although the Talysh language belongs to the Indo-European language family.

Throughout the 65 years of the existence of the Azerbaijan SSR, the Talysh population felt itself the object of various restrictions on the part of the local authorities. who deliberately pursued a policy of assimilation of the Talysh region, and at the same time artificially limited its economic development. Kurds and Talysh were recorded as Azerbaijanis in their passports, and before independence, the country was not considered as separate nationalities when conducting population censuses in Azerbaijan.

==== Talysh-Mugan Autonomous Republic ====
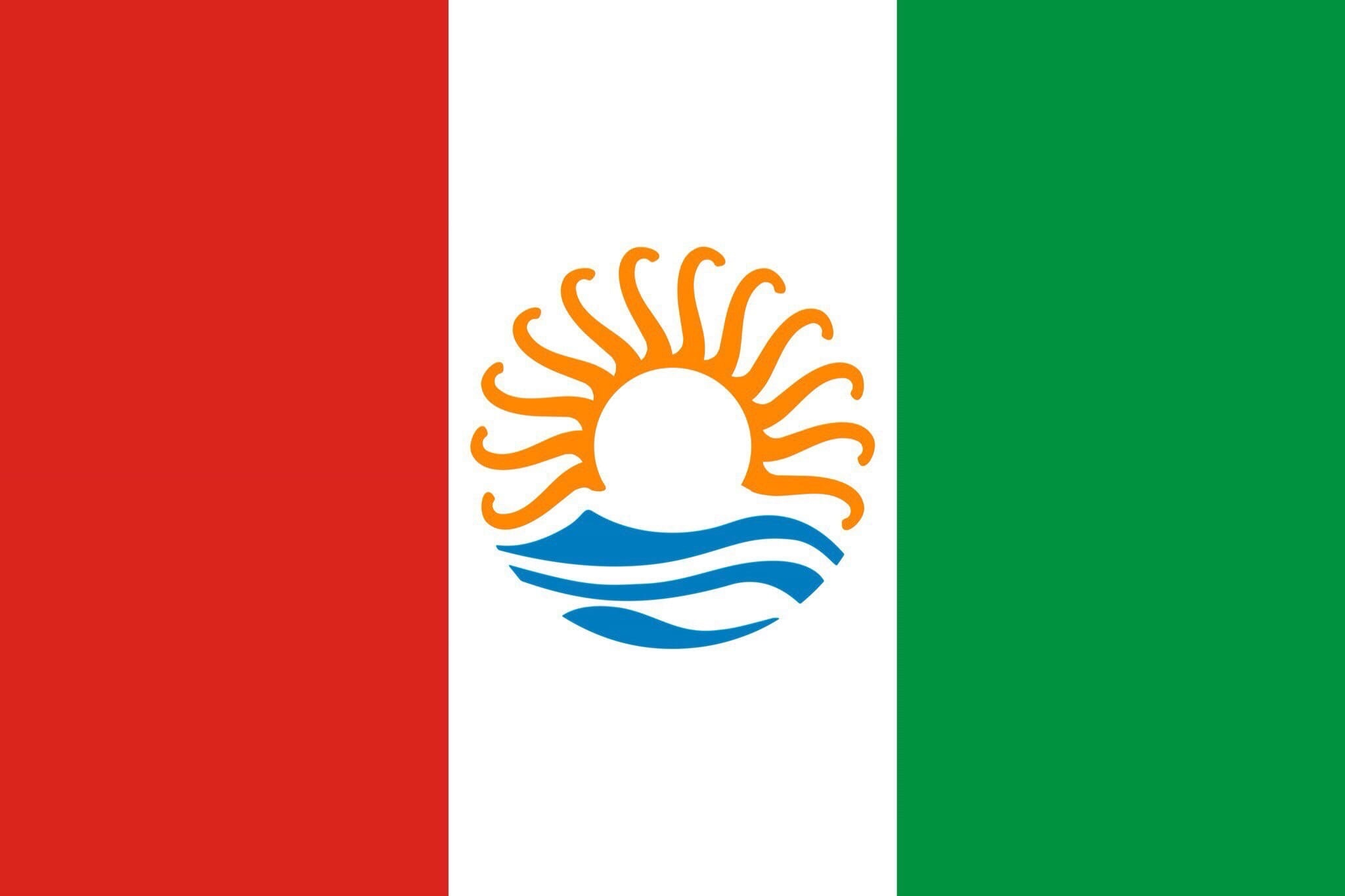
Flag of Talysh-Mugan Autonomous Republic

Already in the late 1980s a Talysh organization called the "Party of Talysh National Revival" was founded. In June 1992, the first official congress of the party took place, which took the name of the Talysh People's Party. The strategic goal of the party was declared the autonomy of the Talysh within Azerbaijan. Since they refused to register the party under this name, it was renamed the “Party of Equality of the Peoples of Azerbaijan”.

On June 21, 1993, in Lankaran, a group of Talysh officers led by Colonel Alikram Hummatov proclaimed the Talysh-Mugan Autonomous Republic. The uprising coincided with a large-scale offensive by Armenian troops on the Karabakh front and the capture of several regions in western Azerbaijan.The offensive caused a mutiny by Suret Huseynov and a general crisis of power in Azerbaijan, which resulted in the uprising of Talysh officers in Lankaran. Local authorities were formed and a constituent assembly called the National Mejlis. At the meeting of the Milli Mejlis, Alikram Hummatov was elected president of the autonomous republic, he met twice with the new head of Azerbaijan, Heydar Aliyev, but neither the first agreed to give up autonomy, nor the second, to recognize it. Two months later (23 August) the republic fell. Alikram Hummatov fled, but Azerbaijani loyalists handed him over to the law enforcement agencies of the Republic of Azerbaijan. The court sentenced Alikram Hummatov to death and after 10 years in prison, in 2004 he emigrated to Netherlands. Under the pretext of containing anti-constitutional goals in the program, the "Party of Equality of the Peoples of Azerbaijan" was banned, although it actually continued to exist.

==== Talysh national movement ====
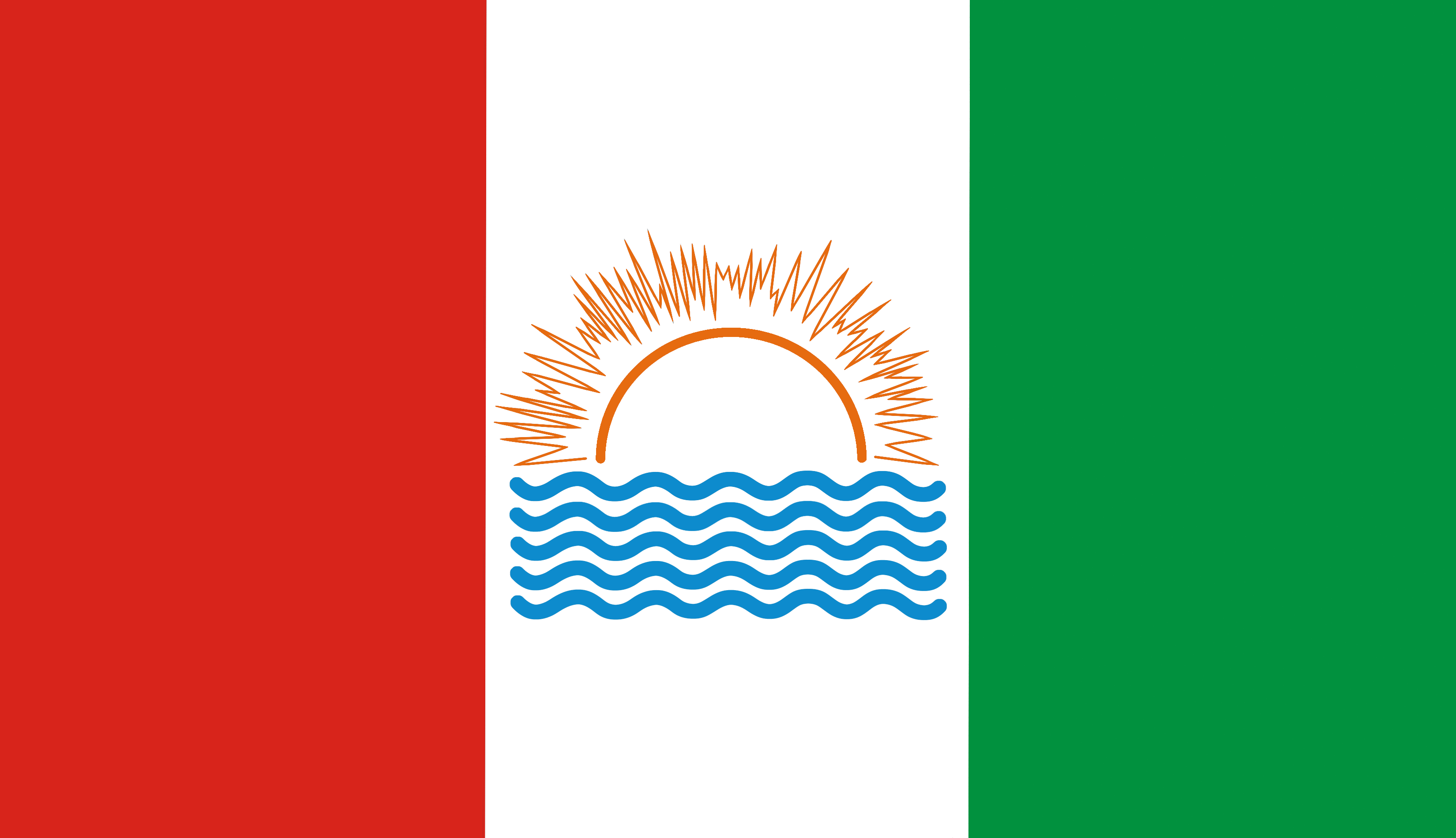
Flag of the Talysh National Movement in the UNPO

After the release of Alikram Hummatov, an organization was created under the official name "Talysh National Movement". The headquarters of this organization is considered to be The Hague, where Hummatov lives; Alikram Hummatov himself is its head. The Talysh national movement is held under the slogan of national autonomy and demands change of the political regime, granting autonomy to all peoples of Azerbaijan, equal relations with all other countries, including the United States.

In July 2018, Fakhraddin Aboszoda was detained by the Russian authorities and at the beginning of 2019 extradited to Azerbaijan, where he was brought to trial for anti-state activities.

On July 15, 2018, a group of young activists, together with Alikram Hummatov, formed the government of the Talysh-Mugan Autonomous Republic in exile. The government sends letters and statements to international organizations, states and world human rights organizations to reflect the position of the Talysh in the country. Calls on the Azerbaijani government to end discrimination against Talysh, demands that the Talysh language be taught in schools and that Talysh people can earn their living in their own country, and not be forced to go abroad. All government ministers of the Talysh-Mugan Autonomous Republic live in exile, in countries such as the Netherlands.

== Geography ==
Talish is located in the southwest of the Caspian Sea and stretches to the north for more than 150 kilometers. Talish consisted of the Talysh Mountains and supplemented by a narrow coastal strip. High rainfall, dozens of narrow valleys, discharging into the Caspian Sea, or into the Anzali Lagoon, fertile soil and dense vegetation ( home of the extinct Caspian tiger) are some geographical features of this land. In the north, Talish merges into the Mugan plain. This territory shapes the historical habitat of Talysh people who have lived a nomadic life, moving along the mountainous streams. Northern part of the Talish includes the districts of Astara, Lankaran, Lerik, Yardymli, Masally, and Jalilabad, with the exception of the small sub-district of Anbaran located on the western side of the mountain chain in the Ardabil province.

The botanical diversity of the region is considerable, comprising over 4500 species of vascular plants. Notably, the Talysh area in southeastern Azerbaijan stands out for its exceptional biodiversity. Within this locale, the arboreal vegetation is particularly diverse, representing the most abundant assortment in the Caucasus region and harboring numerous endemic species. These endemic species, some of which are relicts from the Tertiary epoch, are continuations of the affluent Hyrcanian flora of Iran. Noteworthy examples include Persian ironwood (Parrotia persica), Persian pink siris (Albizzia julibrissin), chestnut-leaved oak (Quercus castaneifolia), Hirkan zelkova (Zelkova hyrkana), Oriental persimmon (Diospyros lotus), Hirkan butcher's broom (Ruscus hyrcanus), Alexandrian laurel (Danae racemosa), Hirkan box-tree (Buxus hyrkana), Caspian honey-locust (Gleditsia caspica), Hirkan fig (Ficus carica), and Hirkan maple (Acer hyrcana). Hirkan National Park (with a total area of 21 435 ha) was established in Talysh, conserving a plethora of relict and endemic plant species from the Tertiary era. These forests are among the most ancient forests in western Eurasia. Among the approximately 1200 plant species documented within the confines of the park, around 100 are recognized as endemic to the region.

== Demography ==
Most of the Talyshis are Shiite Muslims.

== See also ==
- Talish-Mughan culture

== Footnotes ==
=== Sources ===
- Arjomand, Saïd Amir Arjomand (2022). Revolutions of the End of Time: Apocalypse, Revolution and Reaction in the Persianate World. Brill. ISBN 978-90-04-51715-8.
- Asatrian, Garnik; Arakelova, Victoria (June 2014). "On the South Caspian Contact Zone: Some Talishi Folk Beliefs". Iran and the Caucasus. 18 (2): 135–146. doi:10.1163/1573384X-20140204. JSTOR 43899069.
- Axworthy, Michael (2006). The Sword of Persia: Nader Shah, from Tribal Warrior to Conquering Tyrant. I.B.Tauris. ISBN 978-1850437062.
- Bazin, Marcel [in Persian] (1996). "Le Tâleš revisité". Studia Iranica (in French). 25 (1): 115–134. doi:10.2143/SI.25.1.2003968.
- Bazin, Marcel [in Persian] (2000). "TĀLEŠ iv. PRESENT-DAY TĀLEŠ DISTRICT". In Yarshater, Ehsan (ed.). Encyclopædia Iranica (online ed.).
- Borjian, Habib; Asatrian, Garnik (January 2005). "Talish and the Talishis (The State of Research)". Iran and the Caucasus. 9 (1): 43–72. doi:10.1163/1573384054068169. JSTOR 4030905.
- Bosworth, C. E. & Yarshater, E. (2000). "Tālis̲h̲". In Bearman, P. J.; Bianquis, Th.; Bosworth, C. E.; van Donzel, E. & Heinrichs, W. P. (eds.). The Encyclopaedia of Islam, Second Edition. Volume X: T–U. Leiden: E. J. Brill. pp. 166–167. ISBN 978-90-04-11211-7.
- Bournoutian, George (2021). From the Kur to the Aras: A Military History of Russia's Move into the South Caucasus and the First Russo-Iranian War, 1801–1813. Brill. ISBN 978-9004445154.
- Clifton, John; Tiessen, Calvin; Deckinga, Gabriela; Lucht, Laura (2005), Sociolinguistic situation of the Talysh in Azerbaijan
- Floor, Willem (2008). Titles and Emoluments in Safavid Iran: A Third Manual of Safavid Administration, by Mirza Naqi Nasiri. Washington, D.C.: Mage Publishers. ISBN 978-1933823232.
- Jafari, Shiva; Shayesteh, Fereydoun; Abdoli, Ali [in Persian] (2006). تالش [Tālesh]. In Mousavi-Bojnourdi, Kazem (ed.). The Great Islamic Encyclopaedia (in Persian). Vol. 14. Tehran: Center for the Great Islamic Encyclopedia. pp. 346–353. ISBN 964-7025-54-8.
- Piller, Christian Konrad (January 2013). "The Cadusii in Archaeology? Remarks on the Achaemenid Period (Iron Age IV) in Gilan and Talesh". Iran and the Caucasus. 17 (2): 115–151. doi:10.1163/1573384X-20130202. JSTOR 23597592.
- Pourjafari, Mohammadreza [in Persian]; Amirahmadian, Bahram; Rezazadeh Shafaroudi, Masumeh; Poursafar Ghassabinejad, Ali; Shokri, Giti (2001). تالش (یا طالش) [Tālesh (or Ṭālesh)]. In Haddad-Adel, Gholam-Ali (ed.). Encyclopaedia of the World of Islam (in Persian). Vol. 6. Tehran: Encyclopaedia Islamica Foundation. ISBN 964-447-007-7.
- Shahvar, Soli [in Persian]; Abramoff, Emil (2018). "The Khan, the Shah and the Tsar: The Khanate of Talesh between Iran and Russia". In Matthee, Rudi; Andreeva, Elena (eds.). Russians in Iran: Diplomacy and Power in the Qajar Era and Beyond. London: I.B. Tauris. pp. 24–48. ISBN 978-1-78673-336-8.
- Ter-Abrahamian, Hrant (January 2005). "On the Formation of the National Identity of the Talishis in Azerbaijan Republic". Iran and the Caucasus. 9 (1): 121–144. doi:10.1163/1573384054068132. JSTOR 4030909.
- Tucker, Ernest (2006). "Nāder Shāh". Encyclopaedia Iranica.
- Williams, Victoria R. (2020). "Talysh". Indigenous Peoples: An Encyclopedia of Culture, History, and Threats to Survival [4 Volumes]. Santa Barbara, California: ABC-CLIO. ISBN 9781440861185.
- Stokes, Jamie, ed. (2009). "Talysh (Talishi)". Encyclopedia of the Peoples of Africa and the Middle East. historical consultants: Gorman, Anthony; Newman, Andrew. NY: Facts on File. p. 682. ISBN 9781438126760.
