= Talış, Shamkir =

Talış
- Municipality
- Location within Azerbaijan
- Coordinates: 40°52′N 46°16′E
- Country: Azerbaijan
- Rayon: Shamkir

Population
  - Total: 603
- Time zone: UTC+4 (AZT)
  - Summer (DST): UTC+5 (AZT)

Talış (also, Talysh) is a village and municipality in the Shamkir Rayon of Azerbaijan. It has a population of 603.
