= Talış, Ismailli =

Talış
- Municipality
- Location within Azerbaijan
- Coordinates: 40°43′N 48°03′E
- Country: Azerbaijan
- Rayon: Ismailli

Population
  - Total: 263
- Time zone: UTC+4 (AZT)
  - Summer (DST): UTC+5 (AZT)

Talış (also, Talysh) is a village and municipality in the Ismailli Rayon of Azerbaijan. It has a population of 263.
