= Talış, Hajigabul =

Village and municipality in Azerbaijan

Talış
- Municipality
- Location within Azerbaijan
- Coordinates: 40°04′13″N 48°41′28″E
- Country: Azerbaijan
- District: Hajigabul

Population
  - Total: 1,636
- Time zone: UTC+4 (AZT)
  - Summer (DST): UTC+5 (AZT)

Talış (Talysh) is a village and municipality in the Hajigabul District of Azerbaijan. It has a population of 1,636.
