= Atakhan Abilov =

Minority and human rights activist

- Born: June 29, 1965 (age 61); Masalli, Azerbaijan
- Occupation: human rights activist

Atakhan Abilov (Azerbaijani: Ataxan Əbilov; born 29 June 1965) is an Azerbaijani lawyer, legal scholar, author and human rights activist. His legal, academic and published work focuses primarily on human rights, democracy, the rule of law, international law, and the constitutional and political development of Azerbaijan. Abilov is of Talysh descent.

== Biography ==
Abilov studied law at Baku State University, graduating with honors in 1991. From 1991 to 1997, he worked as a lecturer at the university. Between 1997 and 1999, he pursued graduate studies in international law at the Russian Academy of Law.

During the 1990s and 2000s, Abilov was involved in legal research and human rights activities in Azerbaijan. His work focused particularly on international law, human rights and the legal and political development of Azerbaijan. He was a member of the board of the Azerbaijan Lawyers Forum, served as executive secretary of the Azerbaijan Society of International Law and International Relations, and was an editor of the journal International Law.

In 2005, Abilov stood as an independent candidate in the parliamentary elections from the No. 75 Lankaran-Masalli constituency. During the campaign, he drew attention to infrastructure and other problems affecting communities in the region.

According to Amnesty International, Abilov was allegedly detained by officials of Azerbaijan's Ministry of National Security, his apartment was searched, and he was allegedly dismissed from his position at Baku State University because of his political convictions. He left Azerbaijan in 2007.

On 30 November 2008, Abilov was assaulted in Moscow by three masked men, according to a joint statement by Talysh representatives. He was subsequently hospitalized with a concussion and a broken nose.

== Academic and publicistic work ==
Abilov's academic and publicistic work has focused on international law, human rights, democracy, the rule of law, and the legal and political development of Azerbaijan. His earlier work addressed international human rights standards, constitutional law and Azerbaijan's relations with European institutions. In his later publications, he has also examined democratic governance, citizenship, political institutions and the application of international law to contemporary political and human rights issues.

In 2018, Abilov published Demokratiya dərsləri (Lessons in Democracy), a book devoted to democracy, human rights and fundamental freedoms, the rule of law, government and citizenship. The book also discusses the human rights situation in Azerbaijan. Its final section examines the Dutch experience of democracy and the social state, including education, healthcare and relations between citizens and the state.

Abilov is also a contributor to the Baku Research Institute, where he publishes analyses on legal, political and human rights issues concerning Azerbaijan. His publications there include:

- Proceedings in Absentia: A Procedural-Legal Institution or a Political Instrument (22 January 2026)
- Civic Nation and Ethnic Identity in the Context of Azerbaijan (28 February 2026)
- Transnational Repression and International Law: An Analysis of the Azerbaijani Experience (30 March 2026)
- Azerbaijan's 25 Years in the Council of Europe (13 May 2026)
- Why Has Azerbaijan Not Joined the World Trade Organization? (10 July 2026)

== Activities in the Netherlands ==
In 2017, Abilov obtained a degree in Social Legal Services from Inholland University of Applied Sciences in the Netherlands.

In the same year, he completed the research project Basisrechten van ongedocumenteerden in theorie en praktijk (Basic Rights of Undocumented Migrants in Theory and Practice). The study examined the experiences of undocumented migrants in exercising their basic rights in the Netherlands and was included in the publications of Stichting LOS (Landelijk Ongedocumenteerden Steunpunt).

Abilov has also been active as a literary translator. In 2025, his Azerbaijani translation of Dutch author Jaap Robben's Biografie van een vlieg (Biography of a Fly) was published in Baku by Qanun under the title Bir Milçəyin Tərcümeyi-halı. The translation was published with financial support from the Dutch Foundation for Literature (Nederlands Letterenfonds).

== Monographs and legal publications ==
Abilov is the author and co-author of a number of works on international law, human rights and Azerbaijan's relations with European institutions. His publications include:

- Human Rights in International Law and the Constitutional Law of the CIS Member States: The Case of the Constitution of the Republic of Azerbaijan (Baku, 1999), a study of international human rights standards in relation to the constitutional and legal framework of Azerbaijan.
- Council of Europe and Azerbaijan (Baku, 2001), dealing with the Council of Europe, European human rights standards and Azerbaijan's participation in the organisation.
- European Court of Human Rights and Azerbaijan (Baku, 2003), concerning the European Court of Human Rights and the application of the European human rights protection system in Azerbaijan.
- Azerbaijan in the European Family, addressing Azerbaijan's relations with European institutions and its integration into the European legal and political space.
- Private International Law (Baku, 2007), a university textbook on private international law co-authored by Abilov.
- Demokratiya dərsləri (Lessons in Democracy) (Baku, 2018), a work on democracy, human rights and fundamental freedoms, the rule of law, government and citizenship. The book also discusses the human rights situation in Azerbaijan and includes a section on the Dutch experience of democracy and the social state.

Abilov also participated in the preparation of several draft legislative acts that were subsequently adopted by the National Assembly of Azerbaijan. He was the author of the draft law on private international law.
