= Hilal Mammadov =

Azerbaijani journalist and human rights activist

Hilal Mammadov (Azerbaijani: Hilal Məmmədov; b. 1959, Astara Rayon, Azerbaijan SSR) is an Azerbaijani journalist and human rights activist. He is the chief editor of the Baku-based newspaper "Tolyshi sado" ("The Voice of Talysh"), the only newspaper in Azerbaijan printed in the minority Talysh language. After Novruzali Mammadov died in custody, Hilal Mamedov became a second community leader for the Talysh people. He is also known as the author of the meykhana video Ty kto takoy? Davay, do svidaniya! which became an Internet meme both in Azerbaijan and Post-Soviet states.

== Biography ==
Hilal Mammadov is a graduate of the mathematics program of the Baku State University. He is a consultant of the Institute for Peace and Democracy and the head of the Committee for the Defence of Novruzali Mammadov (no relation), a Talysh human rights activist and linguist charged in 2008 with espionage in favour of Iran (in 2010 Novruzali Mammadov died as a result of torture while in prison in Azerbaijan). In 2008, Hilal Mammadov appealed to foreign diplomats to intervene to help Novruzali Mammadov and his assistant Elman Guliyev, who he said were victims of a campaign against minorities.

=== Arrest ===
Mammadov was arrested on June 21, 2012 and accused of possession of illegal drugs (30 grams of heroin). A court in Baku has sanctioned a three-month pretrial detention period for him. Hilal Mammadov is charged under the Article 234, and he can be imprisoned from 3 to 12 years. According to Mammadov's relatives he has never used drugs and the arrest is politically motivated. According to a non-official version, Mammadov was arrested to prevent his participation in a Russian television talk show hosted by Ivan Urgant. Institute for Democracy and Peace and Front Line Defenders organizations condemned Mammadov's prosecution and demanded immediately release Hilal Mammadov as FLD believes the charges against him "are solely motivated by his legitimate and peaceful work in defence of human rights".

According to Azerbaijani human rights activist Leyla Yunus, who held a meeting with foreign ambassadors, Mammadov's arrest is an example of pressure on minority groups in Azerbaijan. Yunus says that the irritation of the authorities could be sparked because the meykhana placed on YouTube was accompanied by a commentary saying "while President Ilham Aliyev spent millions on hosting Eurovision 2012, a meykhana in the Talysh language has become popular for free."

On 3 July 2012, Mammadov's lawyer Anar Gadirli stated that Mammadov was additionally charged with high treason and inciting ethnic hatred.

=== ECHR appeal ===
In February 2016, the European Court of Human Rights condemned Azerbaijan in first instance in the case of Mammadov (no. 81553/12). For the Strasbourg judges, the handling of the case was in breach of articles 3 (inhumane and degrading treatments, right to an investigation) and 34 (right to an individual petition) of the European Convention of Human Rights, and thus condemned the Azerbaijani authorities to pay Mammadov 13,000 euros in non-material damages and 2,500 euros in legal charges.
