= Krista Goff =

American historian

Academic background
- Education: Macalester College (BA); Brown University (MA); University of Michigan (Ph.D.)
- Thesis: What Makes a People? Soviet Nationality Politics and Minority Experience After World War Two (2014)
- Doctoral advisor: Douglas Northrop, Ronald Grigor Suny

Krista A. Goff is an American historian of Russia and the Soviet Union, who specializes in Soviet nationality politics and the history of the Caucasus in the 20th century.

== Education ==
Goff received a Bachelor of Arts from Macalester College and Master of Arts from Brown University. She then earned a Doctor of Philosophy in history from the University of Michigan. She also studied at universities in Saint Petersburg, Irkutsk and Baku.

== Career ==
Since 2021, Goff has been a co-editor of Kritika journal. That same year, with Cornell University Press, she published Nested Nationalism, a work on non-titular nationalities and nationality policy in Soviet Azerbaijan.

As of 2024, she is an associate professor of history at the University of Miami. She is also the co-director of the Russian, East European and Eurasian Studies (REEES) program at Howard University.

== Awards and honors ==
Nested Nationalism has received the Rothschild Prize in Nationalism and Ethnic Studies (2021), Reginald Zelnik Book Prize in History (2021), Baker-Burton Award, and Biennial Best Book in Slavic Studies Award. In 2023, Goff won the Dan David Prize.

== Publications ==
=== Articles ===
- Goff, Krista A. (January 2015). ""Why not love our language and our culture?" National rights and citizenship in Khrushchev's Soviet Union". Nationalities Papers. 43 (1): 27–44. doi:10.1080/00905992.2014.972351. ISSN 0090-5992.
- Goff, Krista (2022). "Postwar Rebuilding and Resettlements in the Soviet Union: A Case of Azeri Migration". Slavic Review. 81 (1): 97–121. doi:10.1017/slr.2022.86. ISSN 0037-6779.

=== Books ===
- Goff, Krista A.; Siegelbaum, Lewis H., eds. (2019). Empire and Belonging in the Eurasian Borderlands. Ithaca, NY London: Cornell University Press. ISBN 978-1-5017-3614-8.
- Goff, Krista A. (2020). Nested Nationalism: Making and Unmaking Nations in the Soviet Caucasus. Ithaca (N. Y.): Cornell University Press. ISBN 978-1-5017-5327-5.

=== Thesis ===
- Goff, Krista (2014). What Makes a People? Soviet Nationality Politics and Minority Experience After World War Two (Ph.D. thesis). University of Michigan. ProQuest 2794517437.
