= Garnik Asatrian =

Armenian professor

Garnik Serobi Asatrian (Armenian: Գառնիկ Սերոբի Ասատրյան; born March 7, 1953) is an Iranian-born Armenian professor who studies and teaches Kurdish culture at Yerevan State University in Yerevan, Armenia.

Asatrian became well known for his extensive research in the field of the study of Kurdish tribal and linguistic tradition and also for the establishment of the Center of Contemporary Kurdish Studies.

== Biography ==
Asatrian was born on March 7, 1953, in Tehran, and immigrated to Yerevan in 1968. In 1976, he graduated from the Department of Kurdish Studies at the Iranian Studies Branch of Yerevan State University.

From 1977 to 1986, he was a PhD student and then a senior lecturer at the Institute of Oriental Studies, Academy of Soviet Sciences in Leningrad in the field of ancient Iranian culture and languages (Avestan, Sogdian, Pahlavi, Persian, Kurdish, and Iranian ethnology). Asatrian earned a doctorate from the University of Leningrad in 1984 and an excellent doctorate in 1990 from the Soviet Academy of Sciences in Moscow.

He has authored 11 books and more than 125 scientific articles in Armenian, Russian, English, German, French, Turkish, Zaza and Kurdish languages. From 1985 to 1999 he was a professor at the University of Copenhagen and participated in various international conferences in Berlin, Moscow, Copenhagen, Oslo, Aarhus, New York, London, Washington, Tehran, and Paris.

He is the founder and editor of three journals: Iran-Nameh, founded in Yerevan in 1993; Acta Kurdica, founded in London in 1994; and Iran and the Caucasus, founded in 1996.

== Views and criticism ==
According to Dutch anthropologist Martin van Bruinessen, the inclination of "the Armenian scholars around Garnik Asatrian" to separate Zazas from Kurds comes from a "definite political agenda".

In a 1998 interview with Onnik Krikorian, Asatrian argued that the concept of Kurds as a unified nation is incorrect and only emerged in the early 20th century through political circles in Germany and England. He stated that Kurmanji speakers in regions such as Western Armenia (Turkish Kurdistan) identify more with their tribal affiliations than as Kurds, lacking a genuine Kurdish national identity. According to Asatrian, radio and mass media have helped Kurds identify as a unified group, though this identity is still evolving, including among the Yazidis. He also pointed out that Yazidis are not Kurds due to their different religion, and that the Kurds of Iran differ from Kurmanjis in language and ethnicity and are a distinct people, although they are also called Kurds.

Researcher and expert on Yazidis Artur Rodziewicz argues that it was difficult not to consider the divergent opinion of Asatrian on Kurds, Yazidis and the relationship between the two groups as politically motivated arising from "the Armenians' attitude towards... Kurds."

In an interview with Golos Armenii in December 2006, Asatrian stated that:

The creation of a Kurdish state—whether on the territory of Turkey or Iraq—is a great threat to our national interests. Attempts are now being made to dismember Iraq and create a Kurdish state on its territory, which will become a front structure for the West. It should be taken into account that if some constructive dialogue is possible with modern Turkey—an established state aspiring to the European Union, then the Kurdish massif is an unpredictable and uncontrollable element, and unambiguously anti-Armenian. And there can be no illusions on this score.

He reiterated this belief to Golos Armenii in November 2009 and further stated that:

Today, Turkey's territorial integrity and stability are in Armenia's best interest. The disintegration of Turkey and the creation of a Kurdish state to our west [Turkish Kurdistan] would pose a serious threat to Armenia's national security. We must remember that the ethnic group seeking to establish a state on our historic lands has, over the past 400 years, committed countless acts of plunder and massacres against innocent Armenians, desecrated our holy sites, and attempted to de-Armenianize Western Armenia. Losing Western Armenia would mean losing sacred symbols like Ararat and Akhtamar to a new Kurdish state. I urge those who do not see how Turkey's stability benefits Armenia to review the programs and claims of Kurdish organizations, such as linking Urartian heritage to Kurdish ancestry and referring to the "Armenian mountain range" as "Kurdistan." Our Armenian society and some political circles clearly underestimate the role of the Kurdish factor in the past and its danger in the future.

== Selected works ==
- "Prolegomena to the Study of the Kurds," by Garnik Asatrian, from Iran and the Caucasus, vol. 13 (2009), pp. 1–58.
- "The Origins of the Kurds and the Early Kurdish-Armenian Contacts," by Garnik Asatrian, from Iran and the Caucasus, vol. 5 (2001), pp. 41–74.
- "The Origins of the Kurds and Early Armenian-Kurdish Contacts," from Iran and the Caucasus, vol. 1 (1997), pp. 1–16.
- Encyclopaedia Iranica: "Dimli (or Zaza)," by Garnik Asatrian.
- "Malak-Tāwūs: The Peacock Angel of the Yezidis," by Garnik Asatrian and Victoria Arakelova, from Iran and the Caucasus, vol. 7, no. 1/2 (2003), pp. 1–36.
- "The Yezidi Pantheon," by Garnik Asatrian and Victoria Arakelova, from Iran and the Caucasus, vol. 8, no. 2 (2004), pp. 231–279.
- "The Holy Brotherhood: The Yezidi Religious Institution of the 'Brother and the Sister of the Next World'," by Garnik Asatrian, from Iran and the Caucasus, vol. 3/4 (1999/2000), pp. 79–96.
- "The Foremother of the Yezidis, from Religious Texts in Iranian Languages," Symposium held in Copenhagen May 2002, published 2007, pp. 323–328.
- Introduction to the History and Culture of the Talishi People, edited by Garnik Asatrian (Yerevan, 2011, in Russian).
- "On the South Caspian Contact Zone: Some Talishi Folk Beliefs," by Garnik Asatrian and Victoria Arakelova, from Iran and the Caucasus, vol. 18 (2014) pp. 135–146.
- "Armenian xoygołowt'iwn (Tracing Back an Old Animal-Breeding Custom in Ancient Armenia)," from Iran and the Caucasus, Vol. 2 (1998), pp. 63–65.
- "'The Mothers of Night': An Armenian-East Iranian Parallel," by Garnik Asatrian and Tork Dalalian, from Iran and the Caucasus, vol. 3/4 (1999/2000), pp. 171–172.
- "Iranian Miscellanea," from Iran and the Caucasus, vol. 3/4 (1999/2000), pp. 203–208.
- "The Origin of the -ng Suffix in Kurmandji," from Iran and the Caucasus, vol. 3/4 (1999/2000), pp. 213–214.
- "A Manual of Iranian Folk Magic in the Archive of the Caucasian Centre for Iranian Studies in Yerevan," by Garnik Asatrian and Victoria Arakelova, from Iran and the Caucasus, vol. 3/4 (1999/2000), pp. 239–242.
- "Āl Reconsidered," from Iran and the Caucasus, vol. 5 (2001), pp. 149–156.
- "Blunt, Bald and Wise: Iranian kund," by Garnik Asatrian and Victoria Arakelova, from Iran and the Caucasus, vol. 5 (2001), pp. 201–206.
- "The Lord of Cattle in Gilan," from Iran and the Caucasus, Vol. 6, No. 1/2 (2002), pp. 75–85.
- "Kurdish Lō-lō," from Iran and the Caucasus, vol. 10 (2006).
- "Iranian Notes III," from Iran and the Caucasus, vol. 13 (2009), pp. 319–330.
- "Some Notes on the Ethnic Composition of the Islamic Republic of Iran," from Farhang-e mardom (Tehran, 2011, in Persian), pp. 10–26.
- "Marginal Remarks on the History of Some Persian Words," from Iran and the Caucasus, vol. 16 (2012), pp. 105–116.
- "The Festival of Throwing Stones," from Iran and the Caucasus 16 (2012) pp. 201–203.
- The Ethnic Composition of Iran: From the "Expanse of the Aryans" to the Myth of Azerbaijan, by Garnik S. Asatrian (Yerevan, 2012, in Russian).
- "Armenian Demonology: A Critical Overview," from Iran and the Caucasus, vol. 17 (2013) pp. 9–25.
- "'Nose' in Armenian," from Iran and the Caucasus, vol. 18 (2014), pp. 147–152.
- "Origine du système consonantique de la langue kurde," by Garnik Asatrian and Vladimir Livshits, from Acta Kurdica, vol. 1 (1994), pp. 81–108.
- A Comparative Vocabulary of Central Iranian Dialects, with notes on dialectology and local toponymy, and a grammatical essay by Garnik S. Asatrian (Tehran, 2011).
- Poetry of the Baxtiārīs: Love Poems, Wedding Songs, Lullabies, Laments, by Garnik Asatrian and F. Vahman (Copenhagen, 1995).
