= Talish–Mughan culture =

Archaeological culture in Iran and Azerbaijan

The Mughan culture or the Talish-Mughan culture is an archeological culture of the late Bronze Age and the early Iron Age epoch (end of the 2nd – beginning of the 1st millenniums B.C.) in the Mughan plain and the Talysh Mountains in northwest Iran and Southeast Azerbaijan.

== Characteristics ==
The characteristics of the Mughan culture are:

1. Graves in stone boxes and the graves.
2. Graves can be single, clustered, or joint – men and women buried together, with a rich and poor inventory.
3. Cattle-breeding, agriculture and maybe fishing were the main occupations.
4. Implements and weapons were made of bronze and iron.
5. Weapons were bronze and iron swords with a bronze two-faucet hilt and bronze poniards with a “framed handle” (of Western Asia type).
6. Pottery was made by hand. A basket-shaped “censer” and dishes in the shape of teapots were distinguished.

Grave inventories reflect a decomposition process of ancestral relations and property differentiation among tribes of the given culture.

== Literature ==
- Пассек Т. и Латынин Б., Очерк до-истории Северного Азербайджана, "Известия Общества обследования и изучения Азербайджана", Баку, 1926, No 3;
- Morgan J., Mission scientifique en Perse, t. 1, P., 1894.
