= Mikhail Matyushkin =

Russian general

Mikhail Athanas'evich Matyushkin
- Михаил Афанасьевич Матюшкин
- Born: 1676
- Died: 1737 (aged 60–61)
- Occupation: General
- Children: Dmitriy Matyushkin Mikhailovich (son)
- Father: Athanasius Ivanovich Matyushkin

Mikhail Athanas'evich Matyushkin (Russian: Михаил Афанасьевич Матюшкин; 1676-1737) was a general of the Russian Empire during the reign of Peter the Great who held pivotal status in the Caucasus and Central Asian conquests. He is noted amongst others for his participation in the Russo-Persian War of 1722-1723, during which, in 1723, he captured the Persian city of Baku after a siege of four days. He was also in charge of the overall conquest of Gilan province in the same year.

== Biography ==
Matyushkin was born in 1676, a member of the Matyushkin noble family. He was the son of the nobleman Athanasius Ivanovich Matyushkin (d. 1676), he himself being a great-nephew of Tsarina Eudoxia Streshneva (1608-1645). Matyushkin had been an officer of the Preobrezhenskii Regiment of the Russian tsar's life-guards since 1691. In 1697, Mikhail was sent to Italy to study marine affairs, but after returning home, he joined the army.

During the Great Northern War, with the rank of Major and in command of a battalion of the Preobrazhenskii Regiment, he participated in the Battle of Poltava (1709) and in the Pruth campaign (1711).

He participated in the Russo-Persian War of 1722-1723, which had been initiated by his relative Peter I. Mikhail was ordered to capture Baku with a flotilla. On 20 June/1 July 1723 the Russian force sailed from Astrakhan and arrived off Baku seventeen days later. After a siege of four days, using heavy artillery bombardments, Matyushkin successfully captured Baku, just a few months after the successful Russian capture of Rasht.

== Sources ==
- Gmelin, Samuel Gottlieb; Floor, Willem M. (2007). Travels Through Northern Persia: 1770-1774. Lightning Source Incorporated. p. 31. ISBN 978-1933823157.
- Grey, Ian (1960). Peter the Great: Emperor of All Russia. Lippincott. p. 425.
- Lee, Peter J. (2013). Peter the Great. Routledge. p. 31. ISBN 978-1136453250.
- Ravindranathan, Ravi (2013). Death Only Wins: The Stalin Trilogy. Xlibris Corporation. p. 372. ISBN 978-1483691145.
- "Матюшкин, Михаил Афанасьевич". ru.wikisource.org (in Russian). St. Petersburg: Brockhaus and Efron Encyclopedic Dictionary.
