= Iran and the Caucasus =

- Language: English
- Edited by: Garnik Asatrian

Publication details
- History: 1997–present
- Publisher: Brill Publishers in collaboration with the Caucasian Centre for Iranian Studies (Yerevan) (Iran)
- Frequency: Biannual

Standard abbreviations
- ISO 4: Iran Cauc.

Indexing
- ISSN: 1609-8498 (print); 1573-384X (web)
- LCCN: 2001227055
- JSTOR: 16098498
- OCLC no.: 233145721

Links
- Journal homepage; Online archive

Iran and the Caucasus is a biannual multidisciplinary peer-reviewed academic journal published by Brill Publishers in collaboration with the Caucasian Centre for Iranian Studies (Yerevan). The journal covers the history (ancient, mediaeval and modern), culture, anthropology, literature (textology), folklore, linguistics, archaeology, politics, and economy of the region. Articles are published in English, French and German. It was established in 1997 by Garnik Asatrian, the head of the center. The editor-in-chief is Garnik Asatrian (Yerevan).

== Abstracting and indexing ==
The journal is abstracted and indexed in the Arts and Humanities Citation Index and the International Bibliography of the Social Sciences.
