= Novruzali Mammadov =

Azerbaijani philologist, journalist and activist (1942–2009)

Novruzali Khanmammad oğlu Mammadov (Azerbaijani: Novruzəli Xanməmməd oğlu Məmmədov; March 1942 - 17 August 2009) was an Azerbaijani philologist, journalist and activist of Talysh ethnicity. He was the founder and editor of the now-defunct newspaper Tolyshi Sado (Voice of the Talysh). Mammadov also worked at the Nasimi Institute of Linguistics of the Azerbaijan National Academy of Sciences and headed a Talysh cultural center, which was closed after his imprisonment.

Mammadov was arrested on 2 February 2007 and accused of working for Iranian intelligence agencies. On 24 June 2008, he was convicted of treason and sentenced to 10 years of imprisonment. He was recognized by international human rights organizations as a political prisoner. He died in a prison hospital on 27 August 2009 after two years of imprisonment.

== Imprisonment ==
In June 2008, trial in the Grave Crimes Court of Azerbaijan, without participation of lawyers, Mammadov's family and the press, announced the verdict against him and responsible secretary of Tolishi Sado Elman Guliyev. They were accused under the Article 274 of the Criminal Code (high treason), and sentenced Mammadov to 10 years of imprisonment, Guliyev - to 6 years of imprisonment (without confiscation of property) in the strong regime jail. Mammadov was accused of espionage in favor of Iran. He was arrested after the newspaper published articles showing well-known poet Nezami as Persian, claiming her mother, named Ra'isa, to be Kurdish, and showing the leader of Khurramite movement Babak Khoramdin as Talysh.

International organizations such as Washington Profile, UNPO and Radio Free Europe/Radio Liberty have voiced their concerns about the arrest of Mammadov.

On June 26, 2008, the Human Rights Commissioner of the Council of Europe Thomas Hammarberg announced, that the Council of Europe "is very dissatisfied" by the verdict concerning Mammadov.

In February, 2009 the representatives of the Organization for Security and Co-operation in Europe (OSCE) Baku Office, Norway's embassy and of the representation of the CE in Baku visited him in jail.

On April 9, 2009, Estonian MP Andres Herkel, co-rapporteur of the Monitoring Committee of Parliamentary Assembly of the Council of Europe (PACE), and Veronica Kotek, special representative of the Secretary General of the Council of Europe in Azerbaijan, had a meeting with Mammadov, who was serving his term in high security Colony No. 15. Herkel said that he, together with the newly appointed PACE rapporteur on political prisoners Christopher Strasser, got acquainted with Mammadov's case, and that he would raise the issue at a meeting with president Ilham Aliyev.

On July 27, 2009, Mammadov was transferred to the hospital of the Penitentiary Service of the Ministry of Justice of Azerbaijan, but was still deprived of duly qualified medical aid. According to Khilal Mamedov he was placed into a common ward, without elementary sanitary facilities and without bed clothes. He couldn't move freely, eat and drink. He suffered from pains and shortness of breath, but did not receive medical care. Mammadov died in an Azerbaijani prison hospital from a heart attack on 17 August 2009.

== Family ==
His sons Emil and Kyamran were repeatedly abducted for short times, and physical and moral pressure was used against them. On September 8, 2007, Kyamran Mammadov died of a heart attack.

Mammadov's other son, Emil, had been charged with storage and use of drugs. A court ordered his release from prison in 2008, finding the charges against him unproven.

== See also ==
- List of journalists killed in Europe
