= Talysh-Mughan Autonomous Republic =

Former autonomous republic of Azerbaijan

Talysh-Mughan Autonomous Republic Толыш-Мығонə Мухтарə Республикə
- 1993
- Flag

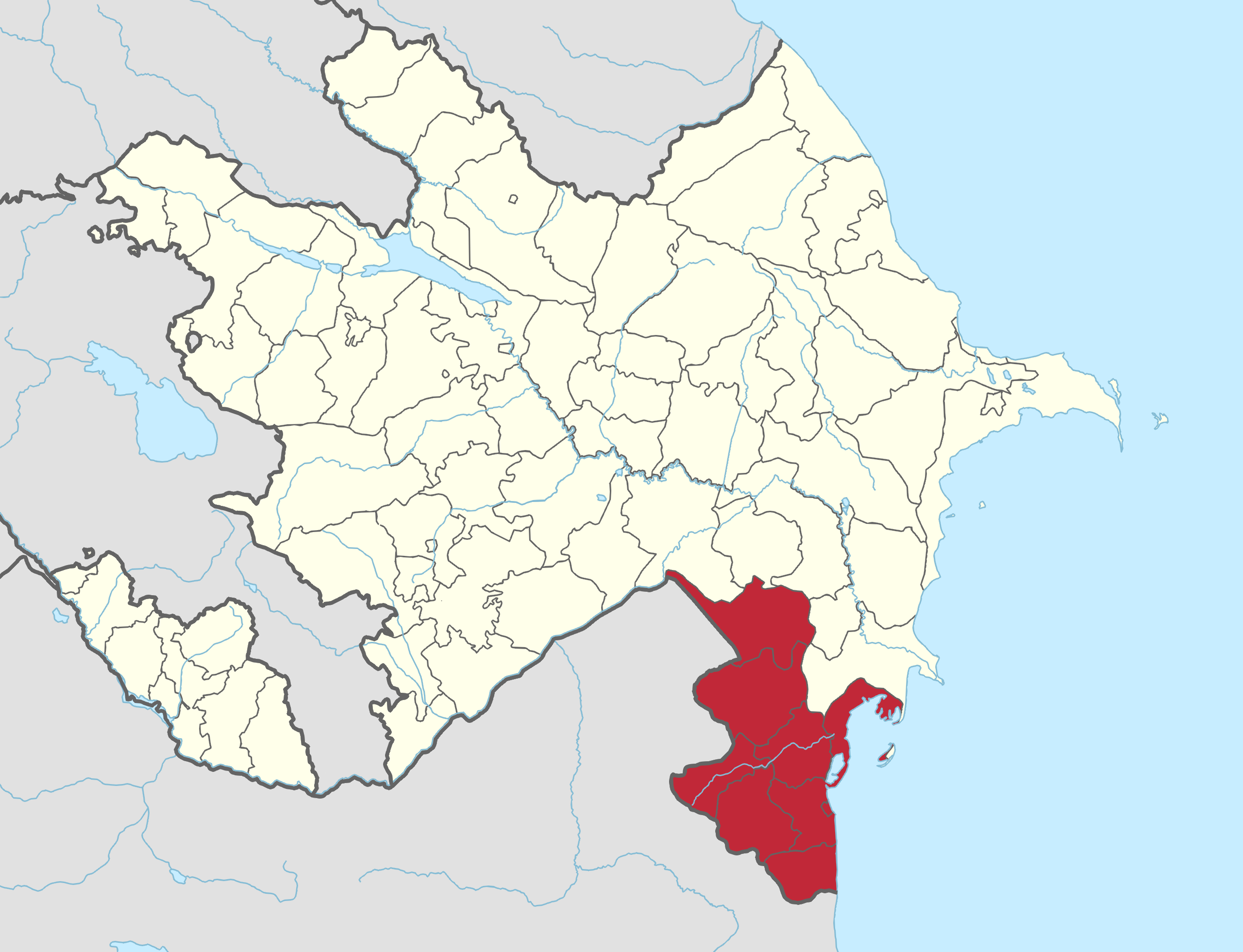
- Map of the districts of Azerbaijan highlighting the six that declared the short-lived Talysh-Mughan Republic.
- Status: Unrecognized autonomy
- Capital: Lankaran (largest city)
- Common languages: Talysh
- Religion: Islam
- Government: Republic
- President
  - 1993: Alikram Hummatov
- Historical era: Post-Cold War
  - Established: 21 June 1993
  - Disestablished: 23 August 1993
| Preceded by | Succeeded by |
| Azerbaijan | Azerbaijan |
- Today part of: Azerbaijan

Talysh-Mughan Republic, officially known as the Talysh-Mughan Autonomous Republic (Talysh: Толыш-Мығонə Мухтарə Республикə, romanized: Tolyš-Myǧonə Muxtarə Respublikə), was a short-lived autonomous republic in Azerbaijan that lasted from June to August 1993.

It was located in southeastern Azerbaijan, envisaging to consist of seven administrative districts of Azerbaijan around the regional capital city Lankaran: Lankaran city, Lankaran, Lerik, Astara, Masallı, Yardımlı, Jalilabad, Bilasuvar. Historically, the area had been a Talysh khanate. The flag of the Talysh-Mughan Autonomous Republic and the modern Talysh flag is a vertical tricolour of red, white, and green with a centred rising sun over the blue sea.

== Political turmoil ==
The autonomous republic was proclaimed amid political turmoil in Azerbaijan. In June 1993 a military rebellion against president Abulfaz Elchibey broke out under the leadership of Colonel Surat Huseynov. Colonel Alikram Hummatov, a close associate of Huseynov, and the leader of the Talysh nationalists, seized power in the southern part of Azerbaijan and proclaimed the new republic in Lankaran, escalating violence. However, as the situation settled and Heydar Aliyev rose to power in Azerbaijan, the Talysh-Mughan Autonomous Republic, which failed to gain any significant public support, was swiftly suppressed.

Alikram Hummatov had to flee Lankaran, when an estimated 10,000 protesters gathered outside his headquarters in the city to demand his ouster.

According to Professor Bruce Parrott,

This adventure rapidly turned into farce. The Talysh character of the "republic" was minimal, while the clear threat to Azerbaijani territorial integrity posed by its mere existence only discredited Gumbatov and, by association, Guseinov.

Some observers believe that this revolt was part of a larger conspiracy to bring back to power the former president Ayaz Mütallibov.

Hummatov was arrested and initially received a death sentence which was subsequently commuted to life imprisonment. In 2004, he was pardoned and released from custody under pressure from the Council of Europe. He was allowed to immigrate to Europe after making a public promise not to engage in politics. However, those who were involved in the proclamation of the autonomy say they always envisaged the autonomous republic as a constituent part of Azerbaijan.

== Ethnic status ==
According to some, the Azerbaijani government has also implemented a policy of forceful integration of some minorities, including Talysh, Tat, Kurds and Lezgins. However, according to a 2004 resolution of Council of Europe:

Azerbaijan has made particularly commendable efforts in opening up the personal scope of application of the Framework Convention to a wide range of minorities. In Azerbaijan, the importance of the protection and promotion of cultures of national minorities is recognised and the long history of cultural diversity of the country is largely valued;

The above quote by the Council of Europe was only about the improvements done by the government of Azerbaijan since 2003. The Communique, however, goes on to say:

Despite certain positive legislative initiatives, there are several shortcomings in the legislation about the implementation of the Framework Convention. The 2002 Law on the State Language contains regrettable reductions in the legal guarantees relating to the protection of national minorities. These put at risk, for example, certain commendable practices in the field of electronic media. The process of amending the said law should be pursued further to make it compatible with the Framework Convention; - There is a need to couple the Law on the State Language with improved legal guarantees for the protection of national minorities in such fields as minority language education and the use of minority languages in relations with administrative authorities, to consolidate and expand the positive practices that exist. Priority should be given to the adoption of a new law on the protection of national minorities, providing the necessary guarantees for the implementation of the relevant minority language standards;

IFPRERLOM appealed to the Commission on Human Rights to adopt a resolution, which urges Azerbaijan to guarantee the preservation of the cultural, religious and national identity of the Talysh people in light of repeated claims of repression.

== See also ==
- Talysh National Movement
- Talish–Mughan culture
- Ispahbads of Gilan
- Talysh Khanate
- Mughan Soviet Republic
