= Alikram Hummatov =

Azerbaijani militant and activist (1948–2022)

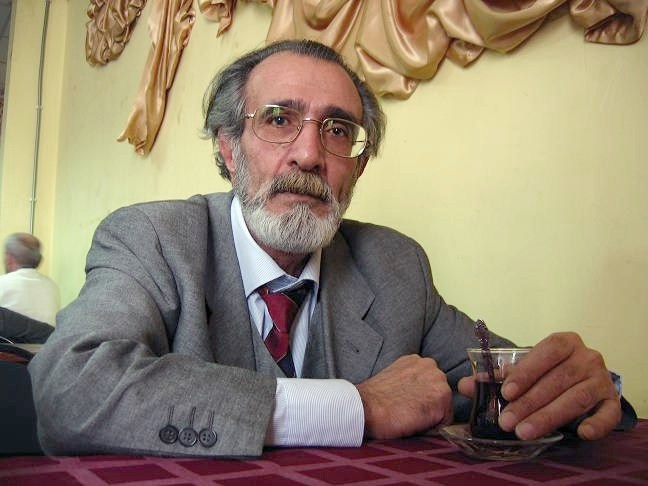
- Hummatov in 2009
- Born: 28 October 1948; Lerik, Azerbaijan SSR, USSR
- Died: 22 December 2022 (aged 74); The Hague, Netherlands
- Known for: Leader of self-declared Talysh-Mughan Autonomous Republic
- Spouse: Sudaba Rasulova
- Children: 2

Alikram Hummatov or Ali Akram Hummatzade (also spelled as Alakram Hummatov, 28 October 1948 – 22 December 2022) was a Talysh military commander and political activist. He was the president of the self-proclaimed Talysh-Mughan Autonomous Republic in 1993 and was imprisoned in Azerbaijan. He was considered as a political prisoner by international organizations including Amnesty International and the Council of Europe. After demands from the Council of Europe, Hummatov was granted retrials, yet according to Human Rights Watch report, the authorities conducted him inside prisons, and with procedural violations. He was pardoned in 2004 and stripped of his Azerbaijani citizenship; he lived in exile in the Netherlands.

== Biography ==
Hummatov was born in 1948. He graduated from the Baku Polytechnical Institute, then worked in the automotive industry. In 1975, he joined the Communist Party of the Soviet Union. He served in different political parties, including the Popular Front of Azerbaijan. Following the dissolution of the Soviet Union in 1991, Hummatov was the leader of the self-declared Talysh-Mughan Autonomous Republic which existed briefly in the south of Azerbaijan at a time of political instability in 1993, and was "seen by many Azeris as a dangerous separatist."

=== Imprisonment ===
In 1995 Hummatov was sentenced to death by an Azerbaijani court, later commuted to life imprisonment, on a range of charges including treason. In an open letter to Azerbaijan President Ilham Aliyev, Sidiki Kaba, the president of the International Federation of Human Rights, wrote that Hummatov and Qaziyez "are being held in Qobustan prison. Their prison system is very strict and sentences them to isolation. In fact, under the pretext of protecting their physical integrity, these two prisoners have been locked up alone, in closed cells at night, which prevents them from receiving medical assistance throughout the night in the case a problem should arise." In prison Hummatov fell ill with tuberculosis and lost almost all of his teeth. He was among those identified in 2001 by the Council of Europe as political prisoners who should either be released or retried. In 2004 Hummatov was pardoned by President Aliyev, stripped of his Azerbaijani citizenship, and sent to the Netherlands where his family lived.

=== Hummatov vs. Azerbaijan case at the European Court ===
After emigrating to the Netherlands, Hummatov made two applications against the Republic of Azerbaijan to the European Court under Article 34 of the Convention for the Protection of Human Rights and Fundamental Freedoms. On 29 November 2007 the court sentenced the state of Azerbaijan to pay the applicant 12,000 EUR for non-pecuniary damages and 2,090 EUR for costs and expenses.

=== Later activities ===
Hummatov continued to campaign in exile for the rights of the Talysh people. In September 2013, he visited the self-proclaimed Republic of Artsakh, two decades after confronting Karabakh and Armenian forces on the battlefield. He met with university students in Stepanakert, where he criticized the current Azerbaijani government and called for a peaceful resolution of the Nagorno-Karabakh conflict, stating "I believe that we must do everything to establish peace in the region so that our beloved children live, create and study in peaceful conditions." Hummatov traveled to Karabakh from Armenia, where he inaugurated a graduate program of Talysh studies at the Yerevan State University on 24 September 2013.

== Personal life ==
Hummatov was married to Sudaba Rasulova; they had two sons. According to Rasulova, neither she nor her children know the Talysh language, and speak only Azerbaijani at home. Rasulova stated that she was unaware of Hummatov's plans to visit Armenia, and she does not understand why her husband traveled there. Hummatov died on 22 December 2022 in The Hague.
