= Talysh people =

Iranian ethnic group

Talysh
Tolışon • تالشان
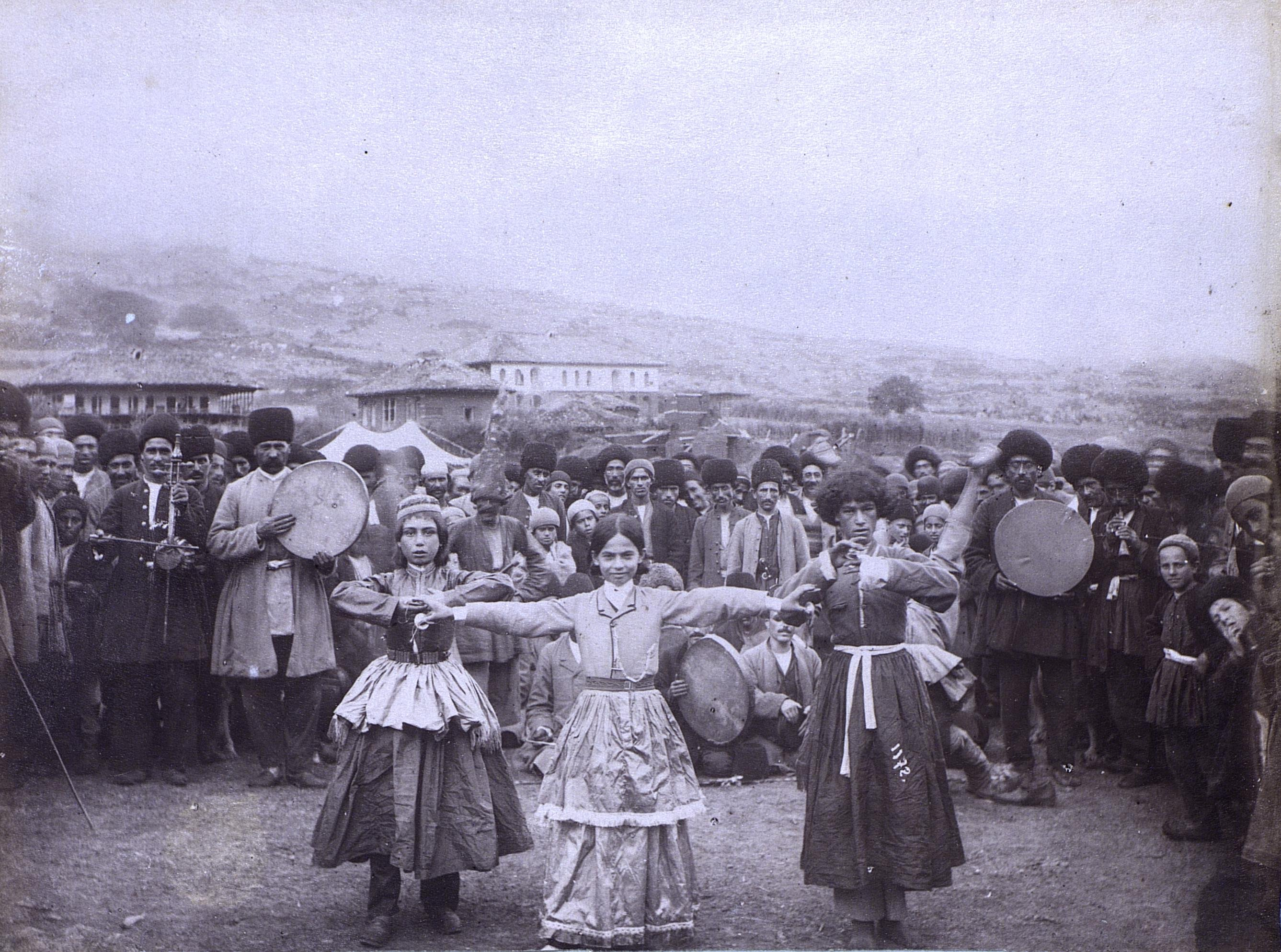
- Talysh people dancing, early 20th century in Iran

Regions with significant populations
- Iran: 700,000–1,000,000
- Azerbaijan: 500,000–1,000,000

Languages
- Talysh

Religion
- Islam (predominantly Shia in Azerbaijan, predominantly Sunni in Iran)

Related ethnic groups
- Other Iranian peoples Especially Tat people (Caucasus), Tat people (Iran), Zazas Gilaks, Mazandaranis and Kurds

The Talysh people (Talysh: Tolışon, تالشان) or Talyshis, Talyshes, Talyshs, Talishis, Talishes, Talishs, Talesh are an Iranian ethnic group, with the majority residing in Azerbaijan and a minority in Iran. They are the indigenous people of the Talish, a region on the western shore of the Caspian Sea shared between Azerbaijan and Iran. The main city of the Talysh people and their homeland is Lankaran, the majority of the population of which is ethnically Talysh. They speak the Talysh language, closely related to Tati and Zaza languages and is one of the Northwestern Iranian languages. The majority of Talyshis in Azerbaijan are Shiite Muslims, and predominantly Sunni in Iran.

The Talysh people are famous for their longevity and centenarianism.

== Origins ==
The Talyshis have traditionally inhabited the Talish (Note: Also transliterated as Talesh, Talysh and Tolysh.) district in the southwestern part of the Caspian Sea, which is usually considered to extend more than 150 km. Today, the northern part of Talish is located in the Republic of Azerbaijan, encompassing the districts of Lankaran, Astara, Lerik, Masally, and Yardimli. Within these five districts there are over 350 Talysh villages and towns. The southern part of Talish encompasses the western part of the Gilan province of Iran, extending to the village of Kapurchal. The most important center of the Talysh people and their ethnic homeland is the city of Lankaran, the majority of the population of which is ethnically Talysh.

It is challenging to determine the Talyshis origin because so little is known about them prior to the modern era. Like other ethnonyms, the name Tāliš cannot be established with certainty. It appears in early Arabic sources as al-Țaylasān. According to Al-Tabari (died 923); "In the mountains surrounding Azarbaijan there used to live such peoples as the Gels and the al-Taylasan, who did not obey the Arabs and mastered their freedom and independence". In Persian, they are called Țālišān and Țavāliš, both plural versions of Tāliš. The native transliteration of Tāliš first appears in the 16th-century, in the Armenian version of the Alexander Romance; "And he related that he is a refugee from the Caspian gates, near the country of Talish, in the province of Gilan."

Local Talysh experts commonly claim that the Talyshis are descended from the Cadusii, an ancient tribe which inhabited the district. According to Garnik Asatrian and Habib Borjian; "this is one of the rare cases when a folk self-identification with an ancient people can be, at least tentatively, substantiated with historical and linguistic backgrounds." The Iranologist Richard N. Frye believed that the Talyshis are possibly descended from the Cadusii.

== History ==
=== Early modern period ===
==== In Safavid Iran ====
The administrative divisions of Safavid Iran in the South Caucasus

Talish has traditionally been associated with either Gilan or Mughan, especially with Ardabil, the center of the latter, which appears to have shared a similar linguistic and ethnic bond with Talish prior to the Turkicization of Iranian Azerbaijan. This connection was still apparent during the time of the early Safavids, who were descended from Safi-ad-Din Ardabili (died 1334), a disciple of Zahed Gilani (died 1301), who was of probable Talysh descent. Two out of the four Sufi teachers of the first Safavid monarch Shah Ismail I (r. 1501–1524) carried the epithet "Talishi". Other figures with the same epithet served as governmental officials under the Safavids and their successors. Several Talysh chieftains were one of the first supporters of the Safavids, who gave them the governorship of Astara, which was part of the province of Azerbaijan. The governor of Astara was also known as the hakem (governor) of Talish, which indicates that Astara was the capital of the district. From 1539 and onwards the governorship of Astara was held hereditarily by the family of Bayandor Khan Talesh.

Talish was composed of various fiefs which would sometimes be granted to other emirs than the governor of Talish. For instance, Mohammad Khan Torkman was given control over a number of fiefs in Talish and Mughan in 1586. Later in 1684, Safiqoli Khan was one of the officers in control of Lankaran, and Hoseyn was another. Meanwhile, the unnamed governor of Talish lived in Ardabil. The Safavid shahs (kings) of Iran attempted to control local Talysh chiefs by subordinating them to obedient officials. Nevertheless, despite their centralization strategy, the Safavid administration was unable to terminate the local autonomy in the South Caucasus. Officially, the local chiefs were not hereditary lords, but officials whose rank were acknowledged by a royal farman (edict) which in reality was an acceptance of their local autonomy. The familial succession of the chiefs gave rise to dynasties that dominated local affairs and sought to consolidate their influence whenever the national government weakened.

During the decline of Safavid rule in the early 18th-century, Talysh leaders attempted to establish autonomous principalities. During the Russian invasion of Iran, the people of Talish volunteered to fight for the Safavid monarch Tahmasp II (r. 1722–1732). The latter was unable to provide them with military or material support; all he could do was give them an ineffective permit that allowed them to collect the taxes of Rasht. In 1723, Russians and Ottomans agreed to divide northern and western Iran between themselves. While the Caspian provinces were under Russian control, one of the local leaders Mir-Abbas Beg, who claimed to be a seyyed (descendant of the Islamic prophet Muhammad), worked together with the Russian commander Mikhail Matyushkin. By the end of 1735, the reconquest of northern and western Iran was completed, being led by the Iranian military leader Nader. It was also during this period that he set his sights on the throne, as he believed his campaigns had stabilised the country and brought him enough fame. On 8 March 1736, he was crowned the new shah of Iran, marking the start of the Afsharid dynasty.

==== In Afsharid and Zand Iran ====
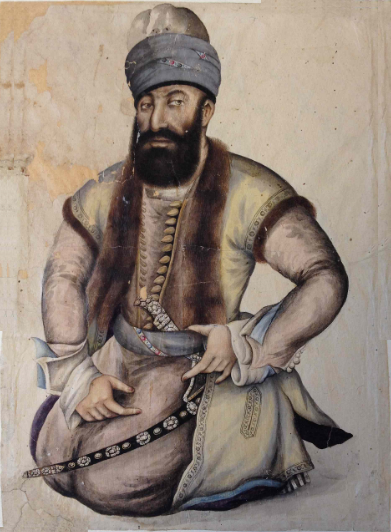
Contemporary portrait of the Zand ruler of Iran, Karim Khan Zand (r. 1751–1779)

Mir-Abbas Beg kept up his relations with the Russians even after they pulled out of Iran. In order to demonstrate his loyalty to Nader Shah, he sent his son Jamal al-Din as a hostage to his court. Due to his dark complexion, Jamal al-Din earned the nickname Qara ("the Black") Beg. He rose to important posts in Nader Shah's army and was assigned the task of putting down Kalb Hoseyn Beg's uprising in southern Talish in 1744. The murder of Nader Shah in 1747 led to the fragment of his empire; in the same fashion as the other rulers in the Southern Caucasus, Jamal al-Din (who had succeeded his father) established himself as a semi-independent ruler, marking the start of the Talysh Khanate, which used Lankaran as its capital. A khanate was a type of administrative unit governed by a hereditary or appointed ruler subject to Iranian rule. The title of the ruler was either beglarbegi or khan, which was identical to the Ottoman rank of pasha. The khanates were still seen as Iranian dependencies even when the shahs in mainland Iran lacked the power to enforce their rule in the area.

Jamal al-Din preserved his fathers correspondence with Russia, sending a letter to its empress Catherine II (r. 1762–1796) that pledged his allegiance to her and offered the Russian troops access to his domains. The Zand ruler of Iran, Karim Khan Zand (r. 1751–1779), was informed of this by Zohrab Beg, one of the grandees of Talish. As a result, Jamal al-Din was sent to a prison in Shiraz, the Zand capital. Karim Khan soon reversed his decision after he had discovered that Zohrab Beg had made an agreement with his rival Hedayat-Allah Khan, who ruled Gilan. Jamal al-Din was thus reinstated in Talish as its governor, being given the title of khan. After destroying Zohrab's army and seizing control of Uluf and Dashtvand, Jamal al-Din now directed his attention towards Astara. He captured and killed its ruler Shoja al-Din, but failed to establish his rule in Astara, as the city was given to Shoja al-Din's son by Karim Khan in an attempt to restrict Jamal al-Din's authority. The latter, however, was able to conquer a number of towns in Talish and gain control over most of the region.

After having made peace with Hedayat-Allah Khan in 1767, Karim Khan confirmed the latter as the ruler of Gilan. The following year, Hedayat-Allah Khan launched an attack into Talish, where he defeated and captured Jamal al-Din, imprisoning him in Rasht. He then installed Jamal al-Din's son Mir-Askar Beg as the governor of Talish. In 1772, Jamal al-Din broke out of prison and went back to Talish. In 1784, the Talysh Khanate was attacked by Fath Ali Khan of Quba, the most dominant khan in the Caucasus. He made Jamal al-Din his vassal and also had him imprisoned in Baku. Due to pressure from Russia, however, Jamal al-Din was soon released. In 1786, Jamal al-Din died and was succeeded by his son Mir-Mostafa Khan.

==== In Qajar Iran ====
Following the death of Fath-Ali Khan in 1789, Mir-Mostafa was able to rule more autonomously. However, a new threat soon emerged. Since the death of Karim Khan in 1779, Agha Mohammad Khan Qajar of the Qajar dynasty was attempting to reestablish the Iranian empire under his own rule. He issued threatening letters to the khans who had established connections with Russia in an effort to reestablish Iranian dominance over the border districts. In 1791, Agha Mohammad Khan plundered Talish, but did not succeed in subjugating it.

Agha Mohammad Khan was prepared to reinstate Iranian rule in the southeastern Caucasus by the summer of 1795. His 60,000 soldiers, which was primarily made up of cavalry, advanced into the area in the summer of that year. The first few months were spent by Agha Mohammad Khan winning the Muslim rulers' compliance. Mir-Mostafa and two other khans (Ibrahim Khalil Khan of Karabakh and Mohammad Khan Qajar of Erivan) entered into correspondence with the Russians, who gave them hope that they could defeat the Iranian forces. Heraclius also contacted the Russians, asking them for assistance against the impending invasion. Agha Mohammad Khan first directed his attention towards Talish; 10,000 soldiers led by Mostafa Khan Qajar was sent to Talish, which quickly submitted.

=== Modern period ===
==== In the Russian Empire ====
Russia more or less openly pursued a policy to free their newly conquered land from Iran's influence. By doing this, the Russian government helped to create and spread a new Turkic identity that, in contrast to the previous one, was founded on secular principles, particularly the shared language. As a result, many Iranian-speaking residents of the future Azerbaijan Republic at the time either started hiding their Iranian ancestry or underwent progressive assimilation. The Tats and Kurds underwent these integration processes particularly quickly.

In the 19th century, there was a migration of Talyshis towards the north of modern Republic of Azerbaijan in search of work in the oil industry and fisheries. As a result, several Talysh-speaking settlements have been continued to exist since that time on the Absheron Peninsula, in particular in Baku, as well as a significant Talysh community in Sumgait.

==== In the Soviet Union ====
Talish was an economically important region for the Soviet Union, as it supplied a wide variety of products, including fruits, vegetables, tea, grains and meat. The military base in Lankaran, located near the border with Iran, was among the largest in the Caucasus.

In the early Soviet period, there were Talysh high schools, a newspaper called "Red Talysh", and several Talysh language books published, but by end of the 1930s these schools were closed and the Talysh identity was not acknowledged in official statistics, with the Talysh being classified as "Azerbaijani".

Talyshis with their identity and language experienced strong suppression in Soviet Azerbaijan. Like many other peoples of the republic, such as Tats and Kurds, the Talysh were subjected to forced assimilation by the Azerbaijani authorities.

The 1939 census stated that Talysh people constituted the fifth largest national community in Azerbaijan SSR, following Azeris, Russians, Armenians, and Lezgins, numbering 87,510 people. However, the Talysh population of the republic, according to the 1959 census, was only 85 individuals. The official explanation of the authorities for the almost complete disappearance of thousands of the Talyshes in this census was that "Talyshes voluntarily and en masse self-identified as Azeri to census workers". In her book, Krista Goff shows through documentary evidence that the Central Statistical Administration in Moscow had plans to include a Talysh nationality category in the 1959 census, but this category was excluded during the process of collecting and reporting the census in Azerbaijan itself.

The leadership of the Azerbaijan SSR used the manipulated census data in Soviet ethnography, creating a narrative about the "voluntary and complete assimilation" of the Talysh people, and that it occurred "naturally over time rather than from artificial manipulations of minority communities and identifications". Subsequently, there followed the production of a large amount of encyclopedic, ethnographic, linguistic, historical-geographical and other material that developed and reproduced narratives designed to justify the national "erasure" of the Talysh and strengthen the official myth of their "voluntary assimilation". Soviet ethnographers emphasized their common features in culture and life with the Azerbaijanis and presented the "assimilation" of the Iranian-speaking Talysh by the Turkic-speaking Azerbaijanis as an "impressive achievement" of the Soviet state, "ethnohistorical progress". So, for example, the Great Soviet Encyclopedia began to say that "in the USSR, the Talysh almost merged with the Azerbaijanis, who are very close in material and spiritual culture, and therefore were not identified in the 1970 census". According to researchers, "erasing" the Talysh from censuses, like some other peoples, was one of the main ways to increase the "titular" Azerbaijani majority in the republic and homogenize it.

This assimilation policy put great social, political and economic pressure on the Talysh and on their daily life, encouraging them to "merge" with the titular Azerbaijani nation. For example, Talysh could not register as representatives of Talysh nationality in official documents, and parents could not enroll their children in schools teaching in the Talysh language. Some Talysh petitioned the authorities for their rights to be identified as Talysh in government documents, but all these requests were rejected by the authorities until 1989. Others, finding no other way out, accepted Azerbaijani identification in order to avoid discrimination in everyday life, for example, when applying for a job. Krista Goff also cites stories of Talysh who admitted that due to the stigmatization of their nationality, the lack of schools, books and other resources for the Talysh of Azerbaijan, as well as the lack of any preferences for being Talysh, they preferred the Azerbaijani self-identification and the Azerbaijani language, even fearing that their children could face discrimination if they speak Azerbaijani with a Talysh accent. Representatives of the Talysh people often internalized these assimilation narratives about themselves that were told to them and which they found in encyclopedias, articles and other printed material.

From 1960 to 1989, Talysh were not included in censuses as a separate ethnic group because they were considered part of the Azeris (Azerbaijani Turks).

In her book, Krista Goff provides interviews with some Talyshes: "During these censuses [from 1959 to 1979] no one asked us about our nationality or self-identification. The census workers sat in the regional or village office and filled in the national composition of the population ahead of time based on orders from above. Then they asked us to fill in the other lines." Respondents also shared with Goff stories about how census takers recorded them as "Azerbaijanis" when they presented themselves as Talysh, and denied the very existence of Talysh nationality; In addition, when collecting information for the census, workers avoided the categories of native language and nationality. During the preparation of materials for the 1970 population census, some ethnographers and cartographers in Moscow expressed doubts about the census data, claiming that the Azerbaijani census authorities artificially assimilated the Talysh in order to "portray their region as more ethnically homogeneous" and Azeris to be "more consolidated", than in reality.

According to Goff, in order to justify the assimilation policy regarding non-titular minorities, Azerbaijani officials and scholars increasingly began to talk from the 1950s about the "purportedly ancient, local origins of the Azeri nation", writing minorities, including the Talysh, into its history. Thus, emphasizing that the Talysh and other peoples of the Azerbaijan SSR "descended from the same ancient population" as the Azerbaijanis (Azerbaijani Turks), they tried to pass off "the formation of the Azeri-defined Soviet Azerbaijani people" as a "natural, centuries-long process rather than the result of forced assimilation, as some minorities claimed."

It was only in 1989 that Talysh ethnicity was returned to the census, immediately counting 21,169 Talysh.

==== In the Republic of Azerbaijan ====
Historical repression of identity and the inability to practice their culture and language has led the Talysh to an internalized self-repression. This makes it difficult to gauge support for any type of Talysh movement. According to Hema Kotecha, many Talysh fear being associated with the separatist Talysh-Mughan Autonomous Republic, with Russia, or with Armenia if they acknowledge or attempt to talk about their beliefs in the public sphere. The fear of the police is another factor to this silence, although support for secular democracy and shared Azerbaijani-Talysh feelings towards Nagorno-Karabakh contribute as well.

The Talysh people have historically had a high birth rate, and during the 2000s, were the ethnic group experiencing the highest growth rate in Azerbaijan.

Radio Free Europe/Radio Liberty voiced their concerns about the arrest of Novruzali Mamedov, Chairman of the Talysh Cultural Centre and editor-in-chief of the Tolyshi Sado newspaper. According to a U.S. government interview with Khilal Mamedov, a Talysh rights activist, Mr. Mamedov: "Accused the Azerbaijani leadership of Turkic nationalism and of seeking to suppress non-Turkic minorities…. He said the Azerbaijani leadership seeks to minimize contacts between the Talysh communities in Azerbaijan and Iran and to run Azerbaijan into a monoethnic state."

The National Talysh Movement (NTM) was formally created in 2007 by Talysh leaders exiled in the Netherlands. The members of the organization include those who were in support of the Talysh-Mughan Autonomous Republic such as Alikram Hummatov, the self-proclaimed president of Talysh-Mughan. The movement favors an autonomous region within Azerbaijan. It also demands the promotion of democratic, cultural, and linguistic rights of all minorities within Azerbaijan.

According to some sources, the Azerbaijani government has also implemented a policy of forceful integration of all minorities, including Talysh, Tat, and Lezgins.

Currently, the Talysh community in Azerbaijan is oppressed by poverty, unemployment and lack of basic infrastructure such as electricity.

Talysh have also settled in other parts of Republic of Azerbaijan. Pockets of Talysh can be found south of the Kura River in the Bilasuvar, Neftchala, and Jalilabad districts. Large numbers of Talysh have also moved to the urban surroundings of the capital, Baku. In particular, the cities of Bina and Sumqayıt have seen an influx of Talysh.

== Language ==
The Talysh language is a Northwestern Iranian language, being part of Tatic language family. Despite the absence of older Talysh texts, it is considered to be descended from Old Azeri, the indigenous Iranian language of Iranian Azerbaijan.

Talysh has three major dialects, Southern Talyshi (Masali, Masulei, Shandermani and others), Central Talyshi (Asalemi, Hashtpari and others) and Northern Talyshi (spoken in four closely linked dialect sections of Lerik, Masally, Lankaran, Astara in Azerbaijan Republic and in the dialects of Astara, Sayyadlar, Vizane, as well as Anbaran and neighbouring villages in Iran). A transitional stage of these dialects also exist, such as in Jow Kandan-e Bozorg, where a transition between Northern to Central Talyshi is spoken. Linguist Donald Stilo argues that Northern and Southern Talyshi should be regarded as individual languages in the same manner as the Kurdish languages, due to the low intelligibility between the two.

== Literature ==
The Old Azeri quatrains of Safi-ad-din Ardabili are considered to be a variant of Talysh. There are two other collections of poetry from the Middle Ages, which are typically regarded as Gilaki, though also occasionally as Talysh; the quatrains by the 13th-century writer Sayyed Sharif al-Din, also known as Sharafshah of Dula or Dulab (i.e. Talishdula[b]); and the poems of Qasim-i Anvar, who lived in the 14th and 15th centuries.

== Culture and religion ==
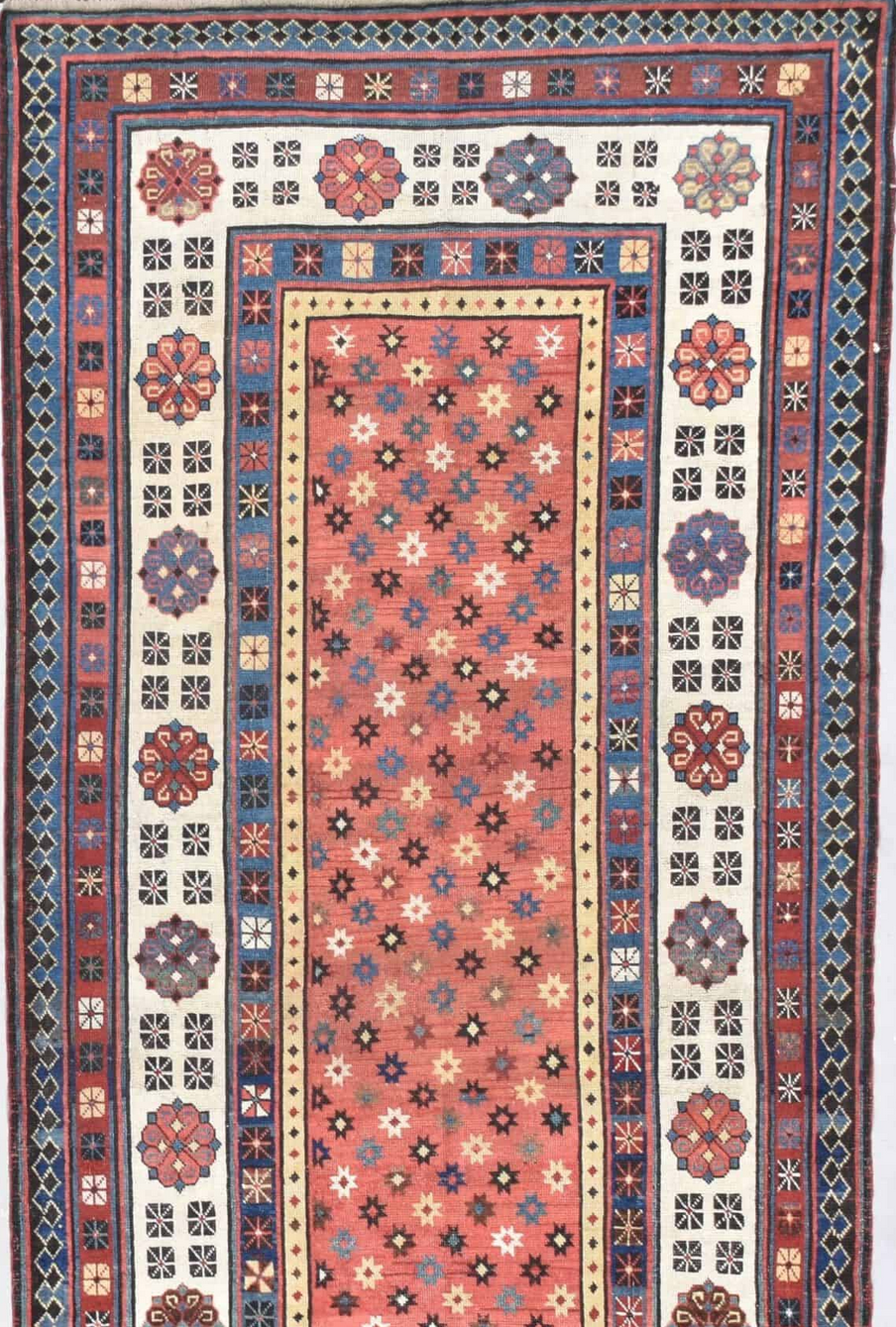
Circa 1860 Star Talish rug (detail)

The Safavids' campaign of Shi'ite proselytism in Talish remained unfinished because of the district's mountainous, remote location. Because of this, a substantial number of the Talyshis in Iran and the Azerbaijan Republic are adherents of Sunni Islam. The majority of the Talyshis in the Iranian portion of Talish are Sunnis and adherents of the Naqshbandi order. On the other hand, the majority of Talyshis in the Azerbaijani portion of Talish are Shi'ites, with the exception of around twenty-four mountain villages.

Despite the fact that the Talyshis in both Iran and Azerbaijan have a distinctive Iranian identity, its importance in Azerbaijan is considerably bigger. Their identity in Azerbaijan is built on the conflict between Iranians and Turks. They have developed a strong sense of self-identity as a result of consistently receiving unfaithful treatment on behalf of Azerbaijan. One of the main drivers of the growing Iranian identity of the Talyshis in Azerbaijan was the rise of the Pan-Turkist ideology in the country after the Soviet era. The Talyshi identity in Azerbaijan has grown significantly during the past few decades. Even after the Talysh-Mughan Autonomous Republic was abolished, Talyshis in Azerbaijan and Russia's diaspora firmly believe in the possibility of an independent Talysh state.

Meanwhile, among the Talyshis of Iran, the search for Iranian forebears among the South Caspian indigenous peoples is an essential sign of their Iranianness.

== Demographics ==
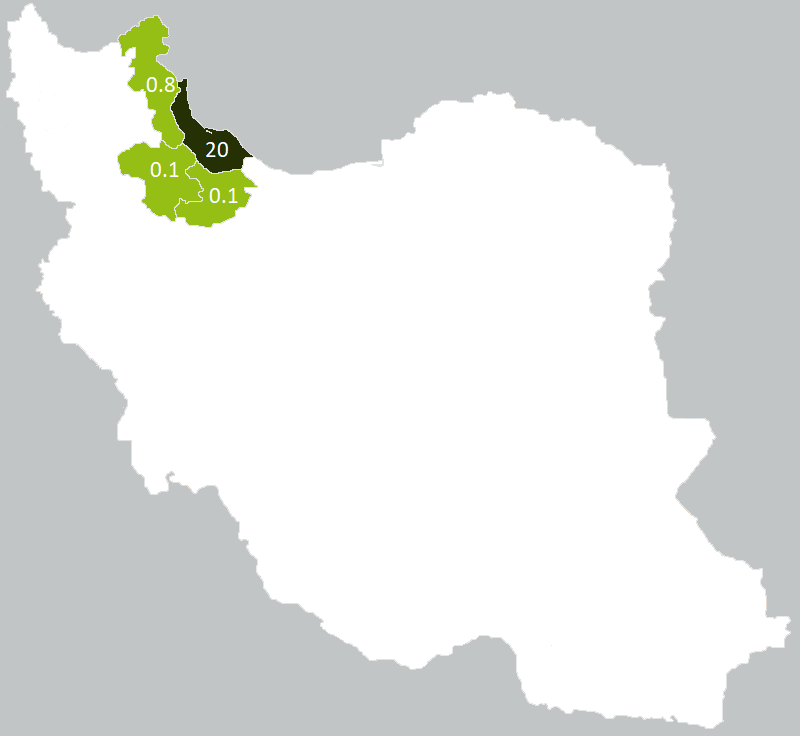
Percentage of people speaking Talysh as their native language in provinces of Iran, 2011

The topic of the Talyshis' population size is among the most difficult areas of research. For various reasons, precise statistics for the Talyshi population in Iran and the Azerbaijan Republic are unavailable. This is demonstrated in the official data on the Talyshis and other ethnic minorities in the Azerbaijan Republic. According to the census conducted by the Russian Empire in 1894, there were 88,499 Talyshis in the area that corresponds to the southwestern part of the later Azerbaijan Republic. However, the number of Talyshis became downplayed during the Soviet era due to the "title nations enlargement" plan.

Data from the Soviet census conducted in 1926 state that there were 77,300 Talyshis residing in the Azerbaijan Soviet Socialist Republic at that time. According to the 1937 Soviet census, the Talysh population had increased to 99,200. However, the Soviet census in 1939 claims that the Talysh population had decreased to 87,500. The Soviet census in 1959 claims that the Talysh population had decreased even more, now numbering eighty five. The Talyshis are not included in any Soviet population census from 1970 and 1979. However, during the Glasnost era of the Soviet leader Mikhail Gorbachev, the Talyshis reappear abruptly again in the amount of 21,200 in the 1989 census of the Azerbaijan Soviet Republic, the final census of the Soviet era.

According to the official 1999 census of the Republic of Azerbaijan the number of Talysh people in the Republic of Azerbaijan was 76,000.

Talysh nationalists have always asserted that the number of Talysh in Azerbaijan is substantially higher than the official statistics. According to unofficial statistics, between 200,000 and 300,000 Talysh citizens live in Azerbaijan. Some claim that the population of the Talysh inhabiting the southern regions of Azerbaijan is 600,000. The number of Talysh speakers in 2003 was estimated to be at least 400,000 in the Republic of Azerbaijan.

According to Swedish scholar on Eurasia Svante E. Cornell Azerbaijani government denies Lezgins claim that the number of Lezgins is many times higher than official numbers, but in private many Azeris acknowledge the fact that Lezgins – for that matter Talysh or the Kurdish population of Azerbaijan is far higher than the official figure.

Obtaining accurate statistics is difficult, due to the unavailability of reliable sources, intermarriage, and the decline of the Talysh language.

The Talysh are the ethnic group experiencing the highest growth rate in modern Azerbaijan.

== Genetics ==
With regards to their NRY-Y-DNA haplogroups, the Talysh show salient Near-Eastern affinities, with haplogroup J2, associated with the advent and diffusion of agriculture in the Neolithic Near East, found in over 25% of the sample. Another patriline, haplogroup R1, is also seen to range from 1/4 to up to 1/2, while R1a1, a marker associated with Eastern Indo-European, which includes Indo-Iranian peoples of Central/South Eurasia, only reaches to under 5%, along with haplogroup G.

== See also ==
- List of Talysh people
- Talysh National Movement
- Talysh National Academy

== Sources ==
- Axworthy, Michael (2006). The Sword of Persia: Nader Shah, from Tribal Warrior to Conquering Tyrant. I.B.Tauris. ISBN 978-1-85043-706-2.
- Arakelova, Victoria (2022). "The Talishis on Opposite Banks of the Araxes River: Identity Issues". Iran and the Caucasus. 26 (4). Brill: 407–417. doi:10.1163/1573384X-20220406. S2CID 254393164.
- Arjomand, Saïd Amir Arjomand (2022). Revolutions of the End of Time: Apocalypse, Revolution and Reaction in the Persianate World. Brill. ISBN 978-90-04-51715-8.
- Asatrian, Garnik; Borjian, Habib (2005). "Talish and the Talishis (The State of Research)". Iran and the Caucasus. 9 (1). Brill: 43–72. doi:10.1163/1573384054068169.
- Behrooz, Maziar (2023). Iran at War: Interactions with the Modern World and the Struggle with Imperial Russia. I.B. Tauris. ISBN 978-0-7556-3737-9.
- Bournoutian, George (1976). The Khanate of Erevan Under Qajar Rule: 1795–1828. University of California. ISBN 978-0-939214-18-1.
- Bournoutian, George (2016a). The 1820 Russian Survey of the Khanate of Shirvan: A Primary Source on the Demography and Economy of an Iranian Province prior to its Annexation by Russia. Gibb Memorial Trust. ISBN 978-1-909724-80-8.
- Bournoutian, George (2021). From the Kur to the Aras: A Military History of Russia's Move into the South Caucasus and the First Russo-Iranian War, 1801–1813. Brill. ISBN 978-90-04-44515-4.
- Clifton, John; Tiessen, Calvin; Deckinga, Gabriela; Lucht, Laura (2005), Sociolinguistic situation of the Talysh in Azerbaijan
- Fard, Fahimeh Khansari; Basiri, Mohammad Ali; Yazdani, Enayatollah (2019). "Ethnic Bargaining and Separatism in the South Caucasus". Region. 8 (2): 173–196. doi:10.1353/reg.2019.0011. JSTOR 26899264. S2CID 214442905. (registration required)
- Floor, Willem (2008). Titles and Emoluments in Safavid Iran: A Third Manual of Safavid Administration, by Mirza Naqi Nasiri. Washington, D.C.: Mage Publishers. ISBN 978-1-933823-23-2.
- Frye, R. N. (1984). The History of Ancient Iran. C. H. Beck. ISBN 978-3-406-09397-5.
- Hambly, Gavin R. G. (1991). "Iran during the reigns of Fath 'Alī Shāh and Muhammad Shāh". In Avery, Peter; Hambly, Gavin R. G.; Melville, Charles Peter (eds.). The Cambridge History of Iran: From Nadir Shah to the Islamic Republic. Vol. 7. Cambridge: Cambridge University Press. pp. 144–173. ISBN 0-521-20095-4.
- Goff, Krista A. (2021). Nested Nationalism: Making and Unmaking Nations in the Soviet Caucasus. Ithaca, NY: Facts on File. ISBN 978-1-5017-5327-5.
- Kolga, Margus; Tõnurist, Igor; Vaba, Lembit [in Estonian]; Viikberg, Jüri [in Estonian] (2001). The Red Book of the Peoples of the Russian Empire. Institute of the Estonian Language.
- Kotecha, Hema (2006). "Islamic and Ethnic Identities in Azerbaijan: Emerging Trends and Tensions". osce.org. Organization for Security and Co-operation in Europe.
- Savory, R.M. (1978). "Ḳāsim-i Anwār". In van Donzel, E.; Lewis, B.; Pellat, Ch. & Bosworth, C. E. (eds.). The Encyclopaedia of Islam, Second Edition. Volume IV: Iran–Kha. Leiden: E. J. Brill. pp. 721–722. ISBN 978-90-04-05745-6. OCLC 758278456.
- Shahvar, Soli [in Persian]; Abramoff, Emil (2018). "The Khan, the Shah and the Tsar: The Khanate of Talesh between Iran and Russia". In Matthee, Rudi; Andreeva, Elena (eds.). Russians in Iran: Diplomacy and Power in the Qajar Era and Beyond. London: I.B. Tauris. pp. 24–48. ISBN 978-1-78673-336-8.
- Stilo, Donald (2015). "The Polygenetic Origins of the Northern Talyshi Language". In Asatrian, Garnik (ed.). Studies on Iran and The Caucasus. Brill. pp. 411–453. ISBN 978-90-04-30206-8.
- Stokes, Jamie, ed. (2009). "Talysh (Talishi)". Encyclopedia of the Peoples of Africa and the Middle East. historical consultants: Gorman, Anthony; Newman, Andrew. NY: Facts on File. p. 682. ISBN 978-1-4381-2676-0.
- Tapper, Richard (1997). Frontier Nomads of Iran: A Political and Social History of the Shahsevan. Cambridge University Press. ISBN 978-0-52158-336-7.
- Ter-Abrahamian, Hrant (2005). "On the Formation of the National Identity of the Talishis in Azerbaijan Republic". Iran and the Caucasus. 9 (1). Brill: 121–144. doi:10.1163/1573384054068132.
- Tucker, Ernest (2006). "Nāder Shāh". Encyclopaedia Iranica.
- Williams, Victoria R. (2020). "Talysh". Indigenous Peoples: An Encyclopedia of Culture, History, and Threats to Survival [4 Volumes]. Santa Barbara, California: ABC-CLIO. ISBN 978-1-4408-6118-5.
