= Lankaran Uprisings =

Armed uprisings in Azerbaijan against the Bolsheviks

Lankaran Uprising
- Part of Red Army invasion of Azerbaijan
Date	July 1920 – February 1922
Location	Astara, Lerik, and Lankaran, Azerbaijani SSR, Soviet Union
Result	Soviet victory

Belligerents
Russian SFSR; Azerbaijani SSR	Azerbaijani guerrillas

Commanders and leaders
Mikhail Levandovsky; Matvei Vasilenko; Anatoli Gekker (Russian Socialist Federative Soviet Republic) Anastas Mikoyan	Yusuf Cemal Bey; Najafgulu Khan; Shahveran; Ahmed Khan; Atakhan; Rashid Khan

Units involved
Red Army: 11th Army (until 1921); Naval Forces	

Strength
At least 3 regiments; 1 cruiser ship; 2 destroyer ships; 5 transport ships	At least 10 detachments

Casualties and losses
At least 196 killed; At least 153 wounded	Unknown

The Lankaran Uprisings (Azerbaijani: Lənkəran üsyanları) were a series of several armed uprisings in the southern districts of Azerbaijan against the Soviet regime starting from July 1920. The early attempts of rebellion were successful, bringing crushing blows upon the local Soviet forces and taking control of many districts in the southernmost districts of the Azerbaijani SSR. But additional Soviet forces were sent to the region via Baku in 1921 and the guerillas couldn't compete with the Soviet naval support from the Caspian Sea. Two more uprisings were commended until 1922, when the Soviet authority finally got full control of the region.

== Background ==
The region is located in the southernmost territories of Azerbaijan, and apart from Azerbaijanis, had a Talysh and Russian population. From 1918 to 1919, the region was the place for the Mughan clashes, between the newly formed Azerbaijani forces, backed by the Caucasian Army of Islam of the Ottoman Empire, and accompanied by the local Talysh volunteers, and the members of the Russian White movement, with the aid of the self-proclaimed Mughan Soviet Republic. The clashes resulted in an Azerbaijani–Talysh victory and Azerbaijani retook the region's control. The Bolsheviks invaded Azerbaijan in April 1920 and formed the Azerbaijani SSR. According to Mehman Suleymanov, the Muslim population of the region was agitated by the Soviet authorities' policies against the local traditions and customs.

== Uprisings ==
The uprising commended in July 1920, and had become widespread by September. The uprising was mainly carried out by seven large detachments. The largest of the detachments was led by the ex-Ottoman officer Yusuf Cemal Bey, who remained in Azerbaijan after the fall of the Azerbaijani Democratic Republic, as well as Najafgulu Khan and Shahveran. It is estimated that the total number of rebels was approximately between six and ten thousand. Yusuf Cemal Bey's detachment carried out operations in the south, while Najafgulu Khan's detachment operated in the north of Lankaran. Yusuf Cemal Bey's detachment first captured Şahağac, Təngərud and Səfidar. The Soviet militia group based in the territory of Zuvand District (now Lerik) was destroyed by Shahveran's detachment. The main driving force of the uprising, which expanded around Astara in early September 1920, was Ramazan's detachment. Another detachment, recruited and based in the Şuva, was led by Gudrat Mollaagha Oglu. Until the end of 1920, the rebel forces inflicted a number of heavy defeats on the Soviet forces in various parts of the region. In December, Yusif Jamal Bey's detachment cleared Astara of the Soviets and headed for Lankaran. Yusif Jamal Bey's advance could be stopped only by the joint efforts of the 245th Soviet Regiment stationed around Lankaran, and by Soviet warships in the Caspian Sea.

To prevent further escalation, the 11th Army Command dispatched the 248th and 249th Infantry Regiments, the cruiser Rosa Luxemburg, the destroyer Pruitki, the Kursk, and five additional transport ships with landing parties on board to the region. Once the forces dispatched from Baku reached the region, they were divided into two tactical groups and dispatched to attack the rebel forces that had taken control of the territory between Lankaran and Astara. One group deployed south from Lankaran and the other north of Astara. The 1st Cavalry Regiment and other military units in the region were to accompany these tactical groups. According to the tactical plan of advance to defeat the rebels, all of the Soviet forces in the region were to organize a group advancing south from Lankaran, and forces arriving from Baku, having come ashore, were to organize a group advancing north from Astara. Despite the strategic advantages, the forces arriving from Baku failed to break through to the shore on December 23. The rebel forces countered the attack and repulsed the Soviet forces. However, the rebels had no means of withstanding the long-range guns of the Soviet ships, and constant naval bombardment forced them to retreat. Soviet forces, actively employing naval artillery, captured and strengthened their positions in the coastal strip between Lankaran and Astara. On December 25, the Soviet forces were able to retake control of the Lankaran and Astara regions.

In early January 1921, a rebellion broke out in Lerik under the leadership of Shahveran. Having tactical advantage, Shahveran inflicted serious defeats on the Soviet troops in the area. During the battle, which lasted from 9 to 26 January, the special Soviet cavalry division lost 196 soldiers, with 153 more getting wounded. In February 1922, a new mutiny of the detachment broke out around Lankaran under the leadership of Najafgulu Khan, and in August of the same year, around Astara with the participation of several other detachments. Detachments led by Najafgulu Khan, his brother Ahmed Khan, Shahveran, Atakhan and Rashid Khan took part in the clashes in Astara. Their resistance was broken by additional forces sent from Baku, especially naval artillery.

== See also ==
- Guba Uprising (1920)
- Tartar Uprising (1920)
- 1920 Ganja revolt

== Sources ==
- Kazemzadeh, Firuz (1951). "The Struggle for Transcaucasia (1917–1921)". Philosophical Library. New York. doi:10.1177/000271625228200189. S2CID 144948317.
- Buldakov, V. P. (2010). Этнические конфликты в России, 1917–1918 гг.: условия возникновения, хроника, комментарий, анализ. Moscow: Noviy khornograf.
- Huseynov, A. A.; Sinitsyn, V. M. (1979). Сражающаяся Мугань (in Russian). Baku: Azerbaijan State Publishing House.
- Ibrahimli, Fazail (2001). "Azərbaycan kəndində sosial-siyasi proseslər. 1920–1930-cu illər" (in Azerbaijani).
- Süleymanov, Manaf (1998). Azərbaycan Ordusu (1918-1920) (in Azerbaijani). Baku: Hərbi Nəşriyyat.
- Gaffarov, Tahir (1999). Aliyev, I. (ed.). Azərbaycan tarixi (1920–1991) (in Azerbaijani). Baku: Mütərcim.
- Gurbanov, Mardan; Alizadeh, Habib (2 July 2014). "Cümhuriyyətimizin fədailəri - Yusif Camal bəy (Camal Paşa) və silahdaşları". Zaman (in Azerbaijani). p. 6.
