= Zindan Fortress =

- Azerbaijani: Zindan qalası
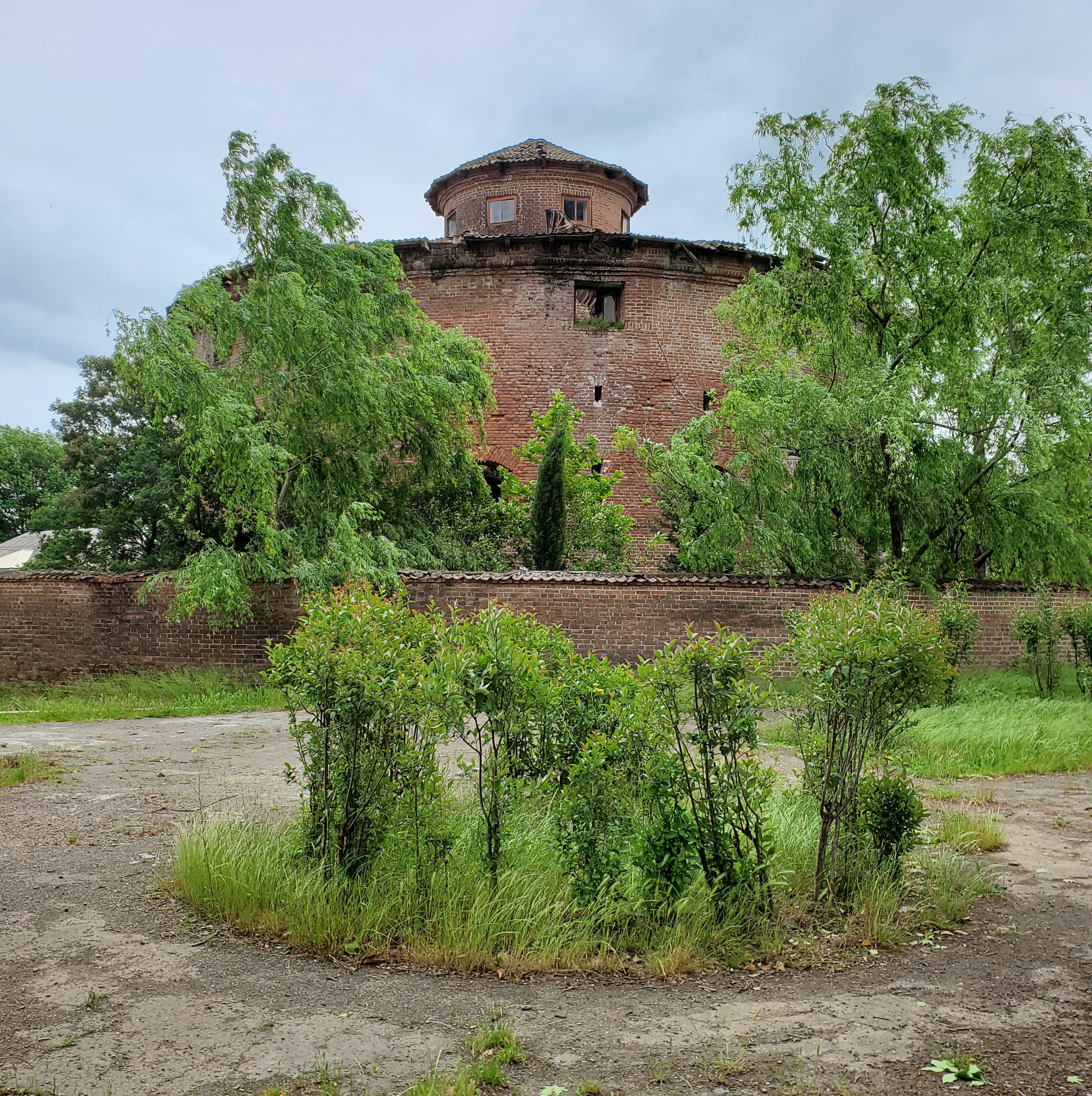
- Interactive map of Zindan Fortress
- Location: Lankaran, Azerbaijan
- Coordinates: 38°45′03″N 48°51′22″E
- Type: Mausoleum
- Completion date: 1747-1786

Zindan Fortress or the Round Fortress (Azerbaijani: Zindan qalası və ya Dairəvi qala, Persian: قلعه زیندان یا قلعه مدور) is a part of the Lankaran Fortress built in the 18th century. This one, as well as the second fortress similar to it, currently used as a lighthouse, were the southern and northern strongholds of the Lankaran Fortress’ system. After the occupation by the Russian troops, the Lankaran Fortress was destroyed, consequently the strongholds were divided. In 1869, a lantern was installed on the roof of the fortress known as the northern stronghold, and the building began to be used as a lighthouse. Currently, the lighthouse is under the jurisdiction of the Caspian Shipping Company. The Zindan Fortress was used as a prison from 1869 to 1959. According to some reports, at the beginning of the 20th century, Joseph Stalin served his sentence here. By the Decree No. 132 of the Cabinet of Ministers of the Republic of Azerbaijan, dated with 2 August 2001, the fortress is protected by the state and is included in the list of the architectural monuments.

== General information ==
The round fortress was built simultaneously with the Lankaran Fortress in the 18th century. The second building similar to this one is currently functioning as a lighthouse. These two fortresses played the role of strongholds on the both sides of the general system of the Lankaran Fortresses. According to some reports, they were built as the strongholds of the Lankaran Fortress at the order of Nadir Shah. It played the role of an important defensive and stronghold in the wars that took place here until 1869. After the occupation of Lankaran by the Russian troops, the common fortress' walls were destroyed, and the military fortress was liquidated. Since 1869, the Round Fortress (tower) began to be used as a prison. A lantern was installed on the top of another fortress, and it began to function as a lighthouse.

The prisoners were taken to the Round Tower by a secret underground tunnel connecting it with the lighthouse. In this tunnel, two people could have moved freely to their full height. Subsequently, due to the flow of the groundwater, the tunnel became impossible to be used. The height of the Round Fortress is 20 meters, the diameter – 72 meters, the thickness of the bearing walls in the lower part – 2.8 meters, in the upper part – 1.5 meters. The fences around the Zindan Fortress and the Lankaran Lighthouse formed the front part of the Lankaran Fortress. Although the prison was designed for 140 prisoners, up to 310 people were sometimes kept in. According to some reports, in 1903–1904, Joseph Stalin served his sentence here, being convicted of robbing a mail train. Later, with the help of his comrades, he managed to escape. The fortress was used as a prison even after the Soviet occupation of Azerbaijan. The fortress was called "Zindan" (dungeon, prison) precisely because there were prisoners in. In 1970–1990, a sewing workshop was located in the fortress.

By the Decree No. 132 of the Cabinet of Ministers of the Republic of Azerbaijan dated with 2 August 2001, the fortress is protected by the state and is included in the list of the architectural monuments. In 2006, the fortress was overhauled according to the plan for the socio-economic development of the regions. After the restoration, an art gallery was placed here. In February 2015, as a result of a heavy snowfall, a certain part of the roof of the fortress was destroyed, the historical monument came into disrepair.

The reconstruction of this historical monument is included in the list of projects implemented by the Ministry of Culture at the expense of the capital investments from the state budget in 2020–2023.

== Photographs ==
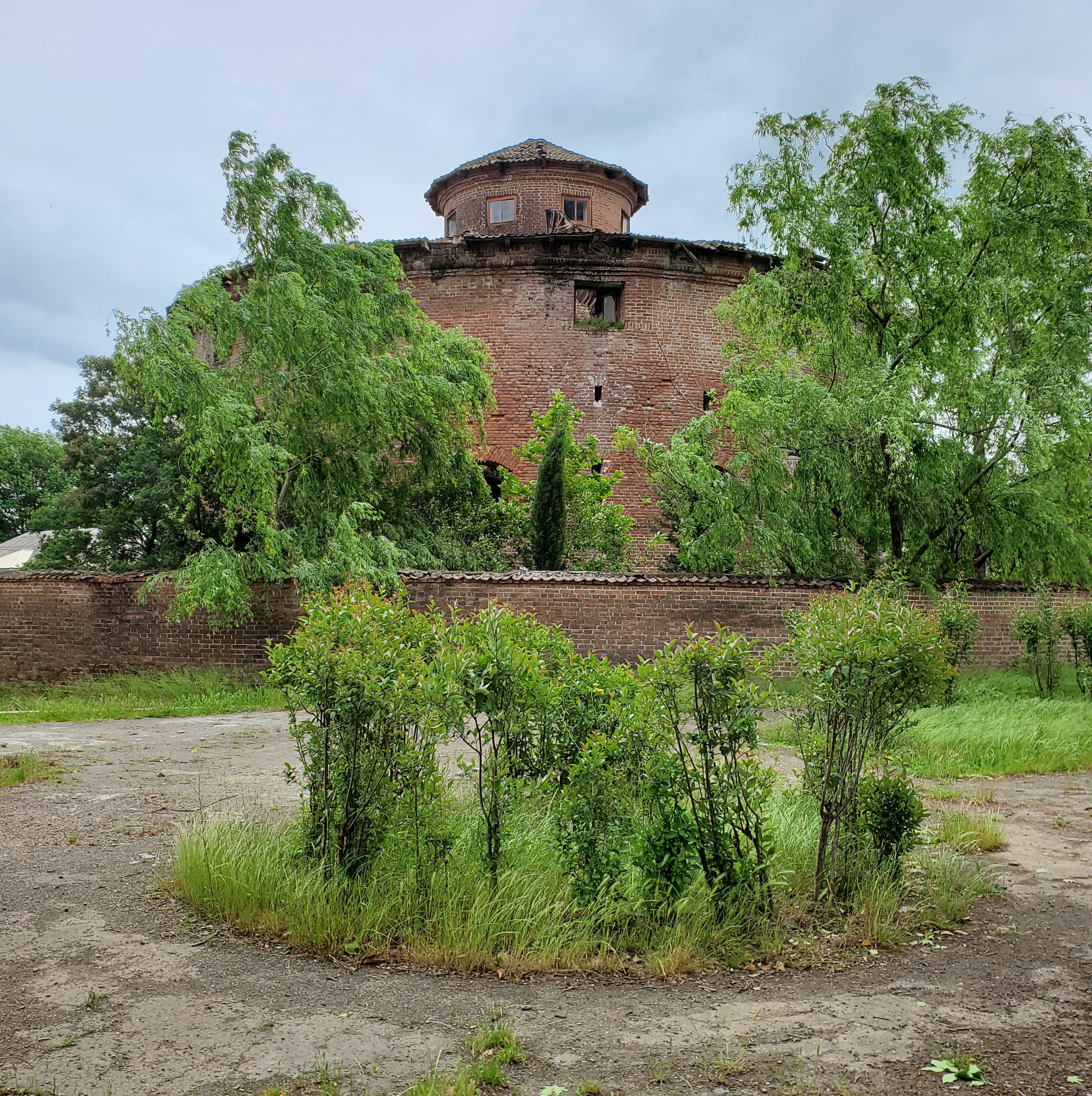

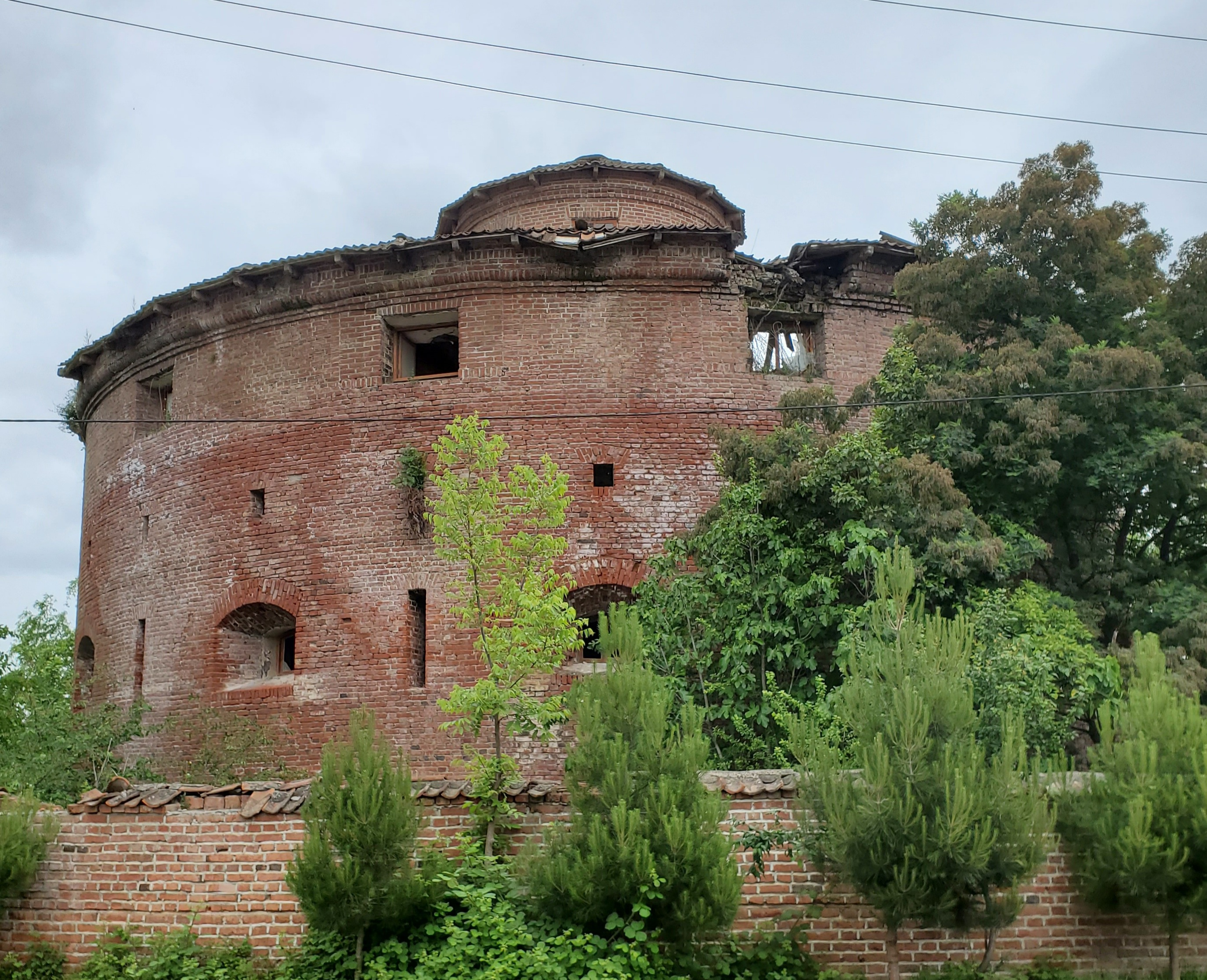

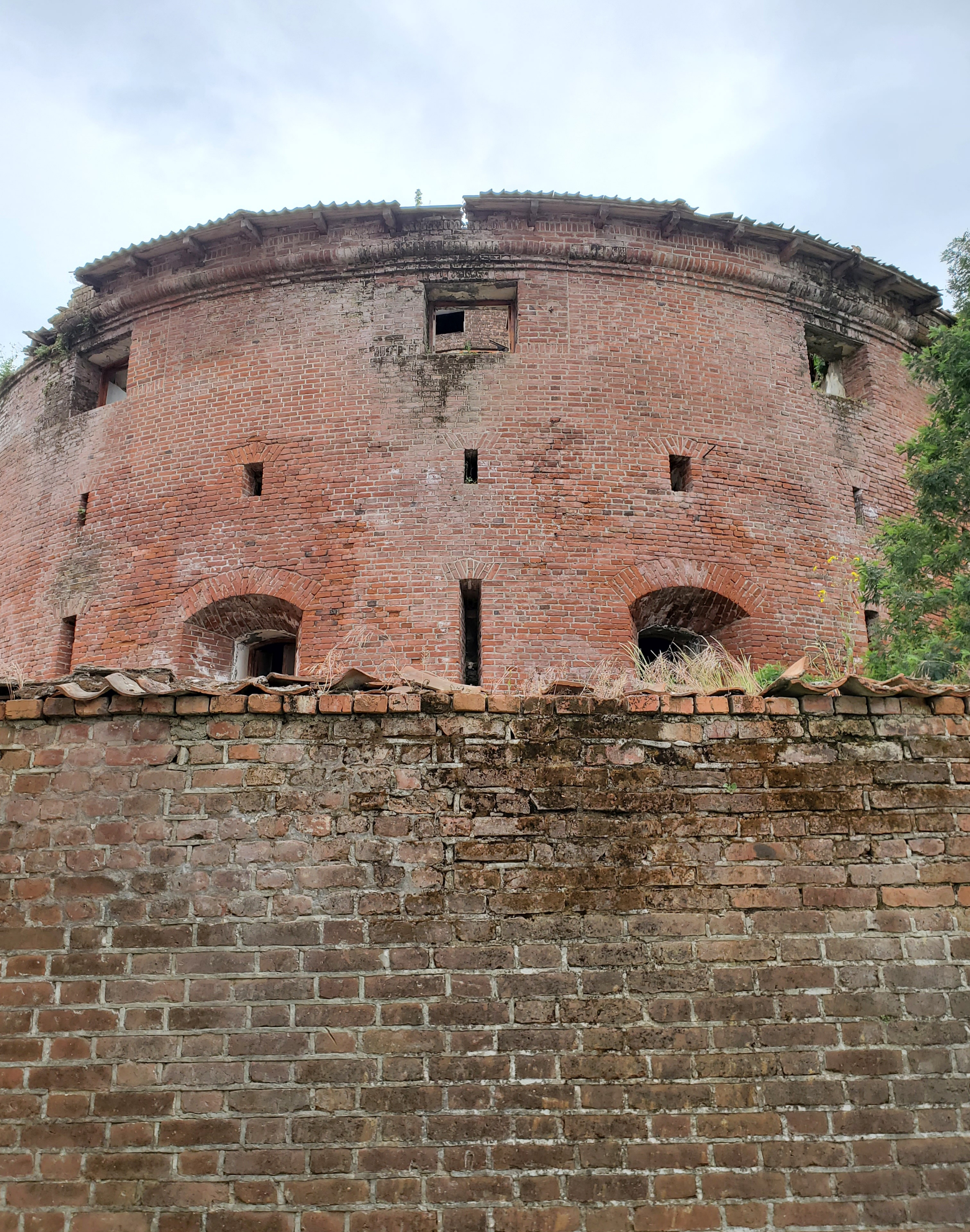

== See also ==
- Boyuk Bazar Mosque
- Kichik Bazar Mosque
