= Fovjul-fusaha =

Literary council in Azerbaijan

Fovjul-fusaha is a literary council in Azerbaijan.

== History ==
In the mid-1840s and 1850s a literary council named Fovjul-fusaha (Group of Orators) was founded in Lankaran. Mirza Ismail Gasir, a famous poet and teacher, led this council. Various professionals participated in this council. The main members of the Fovjul-fusaha were Molla Alakbar Ajiz, Mirza Isa Khayali and Huseyngulu Shuris. They read the works of the classics and wrote imitative poems.
