= Hamdulla =

Hamdulla is a name. Notable people with the name include:

- Hamdulla Afandi Afandizadeh, Azerbaijani military and public figure
- Muhammed Hamdulla Sayeed (born 1982), Indian politician
