= Ləcədi =

- Location within Azerbaijan
- Coordinates: 41°14′N 48°52′E
- Country: Azerbaijan
- Rayon: Davachi
- Municipality: Qələgah
- Time zone: UTC+4 (AZT)
  - Summer (DST): UTC+5 (AZT)

Ləcədi (also, Ledzhedi, Ləcdi, and Ledzhedy) is a village in the Davachi Rayon of Azerbaijan. The village forms part of the municipality of Qələgah.
