= Tartar Uprising (1920) =

1920 Tartar uprising against the Azerbaijan Soviet Socialist Republic

Date	May 1920
Location	Azerbaijan Soviet Socialist Republic
Result	Azerbaijan Bolsheviks victory

Belligerents
Azerbaijan Soviet Socialist Republic	Tartar people

Commanders and leaders
Nariman Narimanov: Dadash Bunyadzade; Chingiz Ildyrym	Rashid agha Cavanshir

Tartar Uprising – the first uprising against the Soviet occupation in 1920. Rashid agha Javanshir was one of the leaders of the uprising. Rashid agha was the descendant of the Panah Ali Khan who was the founder of Karabagh Khanate.

== About ==
=== Outbreak of the uprising ===
On May 21, 1920 residents of the Tartar District staged an armed uprising. By killing 80 Red Army soldiers, they declared their disobedience to the new Soviet government. The commander of the Red Army was killed by insurgents.

=== Suppression of the uprising ===
After 3 days, Dadash Bunyadzade and Chingiz Ildyrym were delegated to the region to suppress the uprising. At the same time, to prevent this uprising, Soviet government sent armed forces to Tartar District. The Tartar uprising was brutally suppressed in May. Some villages were set on fire by shelling. After short time of suppression of the Tartar uprising, the new uprising broke out in Karabakh and the people of Tartar joined the new uprising,

== See also ==
- Guba Uprising (1920)
- 1920 Ganja revolt
- Lankaran Uprisings
