= Hamdulla Afandi Afandizadeh =

Azerbaijan politician

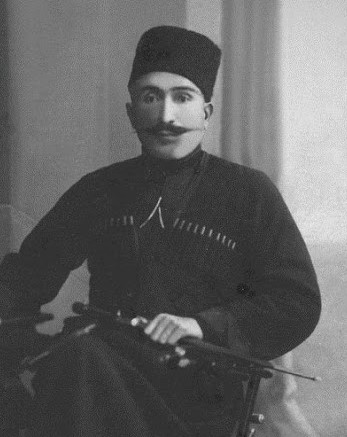

Member of Parliament of the ADR
- In office 15 December 1918 – 27 April 1920

Personal details
- Born: 1870 Qələgah, Kuba Uyezd, Baku Governorate
- Died: July 3, 1929 Nargin island
- Cause of death: Capital punishment
- Party: Ittihad
- Education: Transcaucasian Teachers Seminary
- Known for: leader of the anti-Soviet Guba Uprising (1920)

Military service
- Battles/wars: Soviet invasion of Azerbaijan; Guba Uprising (1920)

Hamdulla Afandi Afandizadeh was one of the active participants in the national liberation movement in Azerbaijan, an Azerbaijani military and public figure during the existence of the Azerbaijan Democratic Republic, a member of the Azerbaijan Parliament, who was a member of the Ittihad party, the main leader of the anti-Soviet Guba Uprising (1920).

Hamdulla Afandi Afandizadeh is the grandson of the famous scientist and saint sheikh (evliya) Ibrahim Afandi (Afandi baba) and the son of Ismail Afandi.

== Biography ==
Hamdulla Afandizadeh was born in 1870 in the Kuba uezd (now the Shabran region, the village of Galagakh). He received his primary education in the village mallakhan and madrasah in Guba. He later graduated from a two-year Russian school (1906) and studied Arabic, Persian and Russian.

Hamdulla Afandi belonged to a famous clerical family that had great influence in the entire district. The grave of Ibrahim Afandi, the grandfather of Hamdulla Afandi, one of the well-known representatives of the Afandi family, was a place of pilgrimage for the Muslim population. His father Ismayil Efendi and his uncle Abdulvahhab Afandi were exiled to Siberia as "instigators of muridism" in "free" settlement as early as 1880. Ismail Afandi died there, and Abdulvahhab Afandi returned to his homeland only after 17 years.

== Activity ==
Afandizadeh took an active part in the political life of Azerbaijan and was an active member of the Ittihad Party. According to the "Law on the Establishment of the Azerbaijani Majlisi Mabusan" of the National Council of Azerbaijan (November 19, 1918), he was included in the republican parliament from the Guba region and was a member of the Ittihad faction.

Hamdullah Afandi Afandizadeh was one of those who provided special services in preventing the atrocities of the Dashnaks during the genocide committed by Armenians against Azerbaijanis in 1918. He fought as part of anti-Armenian groups organized under the leadership of the Guba commissar Ali bey Zizik. When the Armenian Dashnaks, who invaded the Devechi region in April 1918, began the genocide of peaceful Azerbaijanis, Hamdullah Afandi, together with his "right hand" and his ally, the Gachag Mail, fought against the Armenians.

=== Participation in the Guba uprising ===
One of the strongest detachments on the territory of Guba was led by a former deputy of the ADR parliament Hamdulla Afandi Afandizadeh. His brother Shamsaddin Efendi, Turkish officer Ismail Ali Efendi, Sattar Efendiyev, officer of the national army Shukur bey also led the uprising. When the Bolshevik armored train entered Azerbaijan on April 27, 1920, Efendizade and his associates tried to block it, but were forced to retreat due to the inequality of forces. In general, Hamdulla effendi repeatedly faced the armies of David Gelovani, Amazasp, Martikyan, Churaev, Abraab Velnuts in the 18s, as well as Milunin, Moravsky, Shalomov, Molonov, Moyer in the 1920s. He personally killed Lalayana, who staged a massacre in Shamakhi. The Guba uprising, in which 5-6 thousand people took part, was brutally suppressed in September. As a result of operations carried out under the leadership of Aligeydar Garayev and Levan Gogoberidze, 400-500 peasants were killed. Some villages burned down as a result of shelling. The head of one of the large armed rebel detachments, Hamdullah Efendi, retreated to the high-mountain villages bordering Shamakha. The revolted villages came under the control of the Bolsheviks.
