= Səncərədi =

- Municipality
- Location within Azerbaijan
- Coordinates: 38°28′08″N 48°48′19″E
- Country: Azerbaijan
- Rayon: Astara

Population
  - Total: 1,849
- Time zone: UTC+4 (AZT)
  - Summer (DST): UTC+5 (AZT)

Səncərədi (also, Senceredi, Sandzharadi, Sandzharady, and Sanjaradi) is a village and municipality in the Astara Rayon of Azerbaijan. It has a population of 1,849. The municipality consists of the villages of Səncərədi and Şuvaş.
