= Qələgah =

- Municipality
- Location within Azerbaijan
- Coordinates: 41°12′54″N 48°52′16″E
- Country: Azerbaijan
- Rayon: Davachi

Population
  - Total: 255
- Time zone: UTC+4 (AZT)
  - Summer (DST): UTC+5 (AZT)

Qələgah (also, Qalagah, Kalagyakh, and Kelagyakh) is a village and municipality in the Davachi Rayon of Azerbaijan. It has a population of 255. The municipality consists of the villages of Qələgah and Ləcədi.
