= Guba Uprising (1920) =

Armed uprisings in Azerbaijan against the Bolsheviks

Quba Uprising
- Part of Uprisings against the Soviet occupation in Azerbaijan
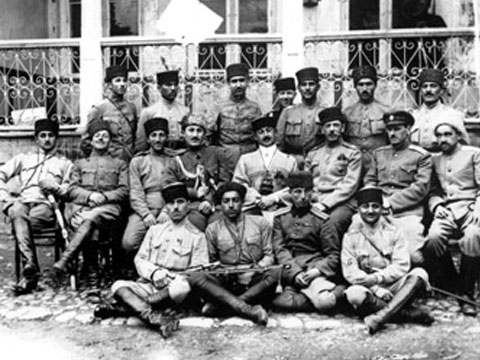
- Azerbaijan Democratic Republic's Army
Date	August and September 1920
Location	Azerbaijan, Quba
Result	The revolt was suppressed by the Bolsheviks

Belligerents
(Azerbaijan Democratic Republic) Officers of the ADR army and the locals	XI Red Army

Commanders and leaders
(Azerbaijan Democratic Republic) Hamdulla Afandi Afandizadeh (Azerbaijan Democratic Republic) Kachak Mayil	Aliheydar Garayev; Levan Gogoberidze Anastas Mikoyan

Strength
5,000–6,000	Unknown

Casualties and losses
400–500 peasants	Unknown

Quba Uprising— the uprising by Azerbaijanis against the Soviet occupation in 1920. Hamdulla Afandi Afandizadeh, Kachak Mail, and ADR army officer Afandiyev were leaders of the uprising which lasted about three weeks. Aliheydar Garayev and Levan Gogoberidze were delegated to the region to suppress the uprising. After weeks of unequal clashes, the rebels were defeated. During the uprising, many villages were burned and 400-500 peasants killed.

== About ==
=== Outbreak of the uprising ===
On August 23, 1920 residents of the village of Kuzun (Küzün) in the Guba district of Azerbaijan staged an armed uprising. By killing two policemen, they declared their disobedience to the new Soviet government. To prevent this uprising, the district committee sent a detachment of 45 armed forces (30 cavalry, 15 infantry) from the 4th Cavalry Regiment to the Kuzun village. However, the detachment was unable to quell the revolt and suffered heavy losses. Only six people survived the detachment. The military commissar of Guba sent troops including a machine gunner to restore Soviet power in the village of Kuzun. On August 26, a new battle broke out between the rebels in the village of Kuzun and Soviet forces. The villagers again resisted the Soviet forces.

On August 29, 1920, a new battle took place between Soviet forces and the rebels at four versts of Guba. Soviet troops of a hundred men suffered heavy casualties. By the end of August and the beginning of September, an armed rebel group had already been formed. There were also Turkish officers in the group led by Lieutenant Colonel Afandiyev of the Republican Army. The rebels seized a large number of machine guns and five-barreled rifles. At 7 am on September 3, 1920 the rebels attacked Davachi-Khachmaz region. There they clashed with the seventh cavalry detachment. After a fierce battle, Soviet-Bolshevik fighters were able to maintain their positions. However, four of them were killed and four Lewis machine guns were seized. An armored train of the Bolsheviks was placed near Khachmaz which was increasing their chances to attack. However, the rebels were in positions that could not be reached by artillery fire of the train. According to the intelligence, the locals who were also against the new regime formed an armed group in Charkhi station.

One of the strongest groups in Guba was led by Hamdulla Afandi Afandizadeh, a former member of the Parliament of the Azerbaijan Democratic Republic. Sattar Afandiyev, a national army officer Shukur Bey, a Turkish officer Ismail Ali Afandi and Shamsaddin Afandi, brother of Hamdulla Afandi Afandizadeh, also led the uprising.

=== Suppression of the uprising ===
These uprising, which were dangerous for the Soviet regime, were seriously discussed at the plenum of the Central Committee of the Communist Party of Azerbaijan on September 9, 1920. The plenum decided to send Aliheydar Garayev and Levan Gogoberidze to quell the Guba uprising, and to appoint Gazanfar Musabayov as the emergency commissioner of the Guba district.

On September 11, 1920, the emergency commissioner of the district, Gazanfar Musabayov, appealed to the people of Guba. The appeal provided information about the uprising that took place in the district under the leadership of Hamdulla Efendi and Kachak Mail, as well as its suppression. To prevent the uprising from escalating, Musabayov announced an amnesty on behalf of the Soviet government to the rebels and called on the militants to surrender their weapons. He also announced that any new attempts to revolt against the Soviet government would be ruthlessly suppressed. Representatives of the Soviet government in Guba and the 11th Army also appealed to the people of Guba to collect weapons and prevent new uprisings. The appeal also called on the population not to believe the propaganda against the Bolshevik forces, not to join the local Beys and Khans who took a stance against the Soviet government, and to hand over their weapons to the authorities.

The Guba uprising, in which 5,000 to 6,000 people took part, was brutally suppressed in September. 400 - 500 villagers were killed in operations led by Aliheydar Garayev and Levan Gogoberidze, who were sent to the region to quell the uprising. Some villages were set on fire by shelling. Hamdulla Efendi, the leader of one of the largest armed groups of the Guba rebels, which was hardly suppressed, retreated to the high mountain villages bordering Shamakhi. The rebelled villages ended under Bolshevik control.

== See also ==
- Ganja Uprising
- Svaneti uprising of 1921 in Georgia.
- February Uprising 1921, in Armenia
- Tartar Uprising (1920)
