= Boyuk Bazar Mosque =

Mosque in Lankaran, Azerbaijan

- Azerbaijani: Böyük Bazar məscidi; Arabic: مسجد بويوك بازار (لنكران)
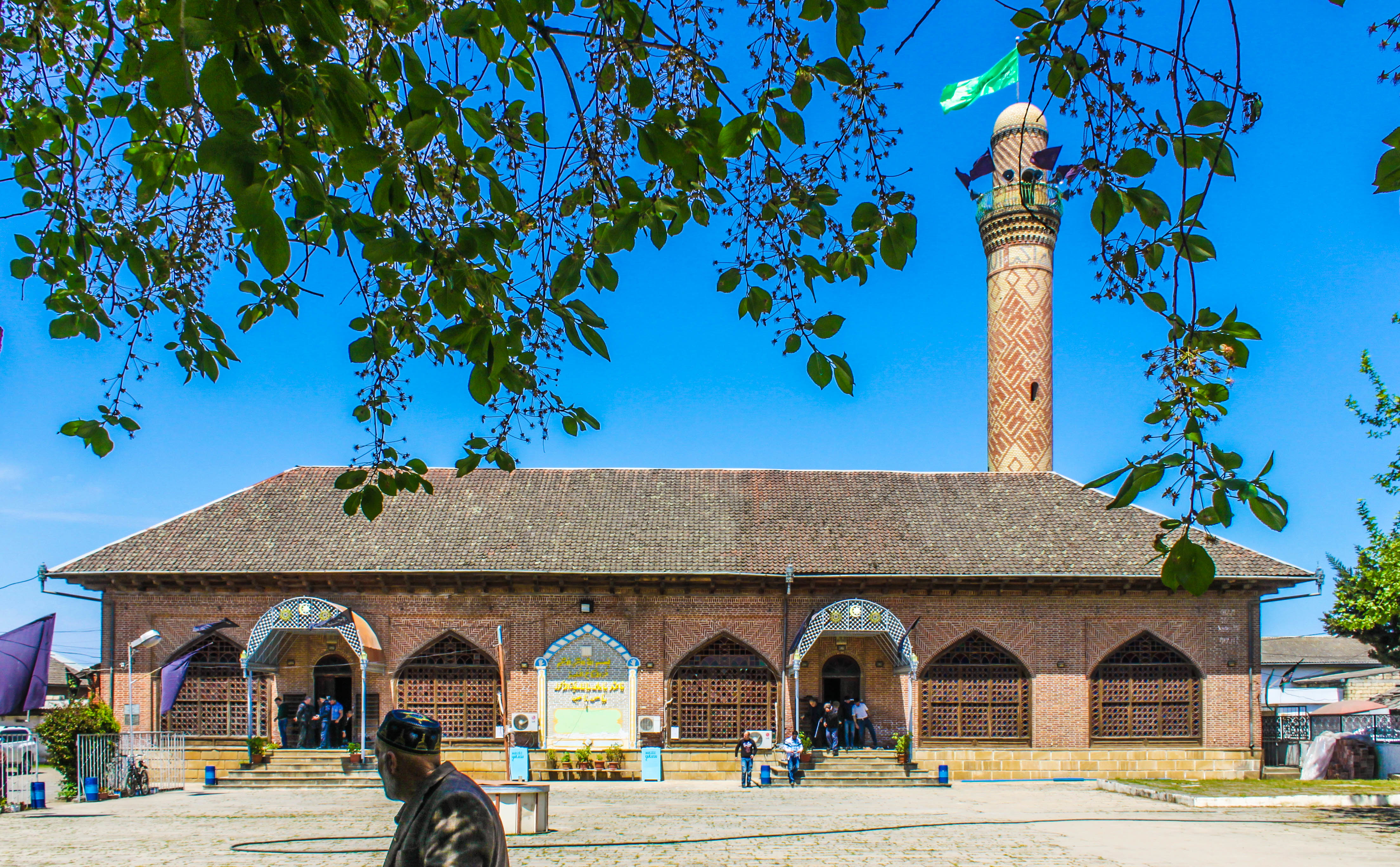
- The mosque in 2016

- Location of the mosque in Azerbaijan

Religion
- Affiliation: Shia Islam
- Ecclesiastical or organisational status: Mosque (1864–1928); Profane use (1928–1990); Mosque (since 1990)
- Status: Active

Location
- Location: Lankaran
- Country: Azerbaijan
- Coordinates: 38°45′05″N 48°50′49″E

Architecture
- Type: Mosque architecture
- Style: Islamic
- Completed: 1864

Specifications
- Capacity: 500 worshipers
- Length: 31.5 m (103 ft)
- Width: 12.7 m (42 ft)
- Interior area: 500 m^{2} (5,400 sq ft)
- Minaret: One
- Minaret height: 36 m (118 ft)
- Materials: Brick

The Boyuk Bazar Mosque (Azerbaijani: Böyük Bazar məscidi; Arabic: مسجد بويوك بازار (لنكران)) is a Shia mosque, located in the city of Lankaran, Azerbaijan. The mosque was built in 1864 in the Boyuk Bazar neighborhood.

By the order of the Cabinet of Ministers of the Republic of Azerbaijan dated 2 August 2001, the mosque was taken under the state protection as an architectural monument of history and culture of local significance (No. 4805).

== About ==
The Boyuk Bazar Mosque was built in 1864 in the Boyuk Bazar neighborhood of Lankaran city. It was constructed through the funds collected by the community members, including Kerbelayi Gulu, Kerbelayi Aghaqulu, Hacı Miragha, and the residents of the Boyuk Bazar neighborhood. The mosque took its name from the neighborhood where it is situated. The architect of the mosque was Master Hadı.

After the Soviet occupation in Azerbaijan, the official struggle against religion began in 1928. In December of that year, the Azerbaijan Communist Party Central Committee transferred many mosques, churches, and synagogues to the balance of clubs for educational purposes. If there were 3,000 mosques in Azerbaijan in 1917, by 1927 this number had decreased to 1,700, and by 1933 it was only 17. The Boyuk Bazar Mosque was also closed, and the building was used as a warehouse, library, and photo gallery. Until 1929, there were a total of 6 tekkes (Sufi lodges) in the courtyard of the mosque, named after Kerbelayi Huseyin, General Hacı Mirabbas Khan Talishinski, the Karimovs, Hajı Manaf, Hacı Ələsgər, and another named after Hacı Alasgar. In the 1930s, the lodge of Hajı Agha Akbarov was added, among other lodges, and in 1938, the minaret of the mosque, used for calling to prayer, was demolished. From 1938 to 1980, the building of the mosque housed a bakery, and from 1980 to 1990, it served as a photo gallery.

After Azerbaijan regained its independence, the mosque was included in the list of local significant immovable historical and cultural monuments by the decision No. 132 of the Cabinet of Ministers of the Republic of Azerbaijan on August 2, 2001. In 1995, with the initiative of the local community, a minaret, 36 m (118 ft) high, was built next to the mosque. The mosque hosts the activities of a religious community registered with the State Committee.

== Architecture ==
The mosque is 31.5 m (103 ft) long and 12.7 m (42 ft) wide. It was constructed using timber from the forest and baked bricks. The roof is covered with tiles. The area of the mosque is 500 m^{2} (5,400 sq ft), with a capacity of 550 people. The ceiling is rectangular and is supported by six columns. The mosque consists of main and auxiliary buildings.

== Gallery ==
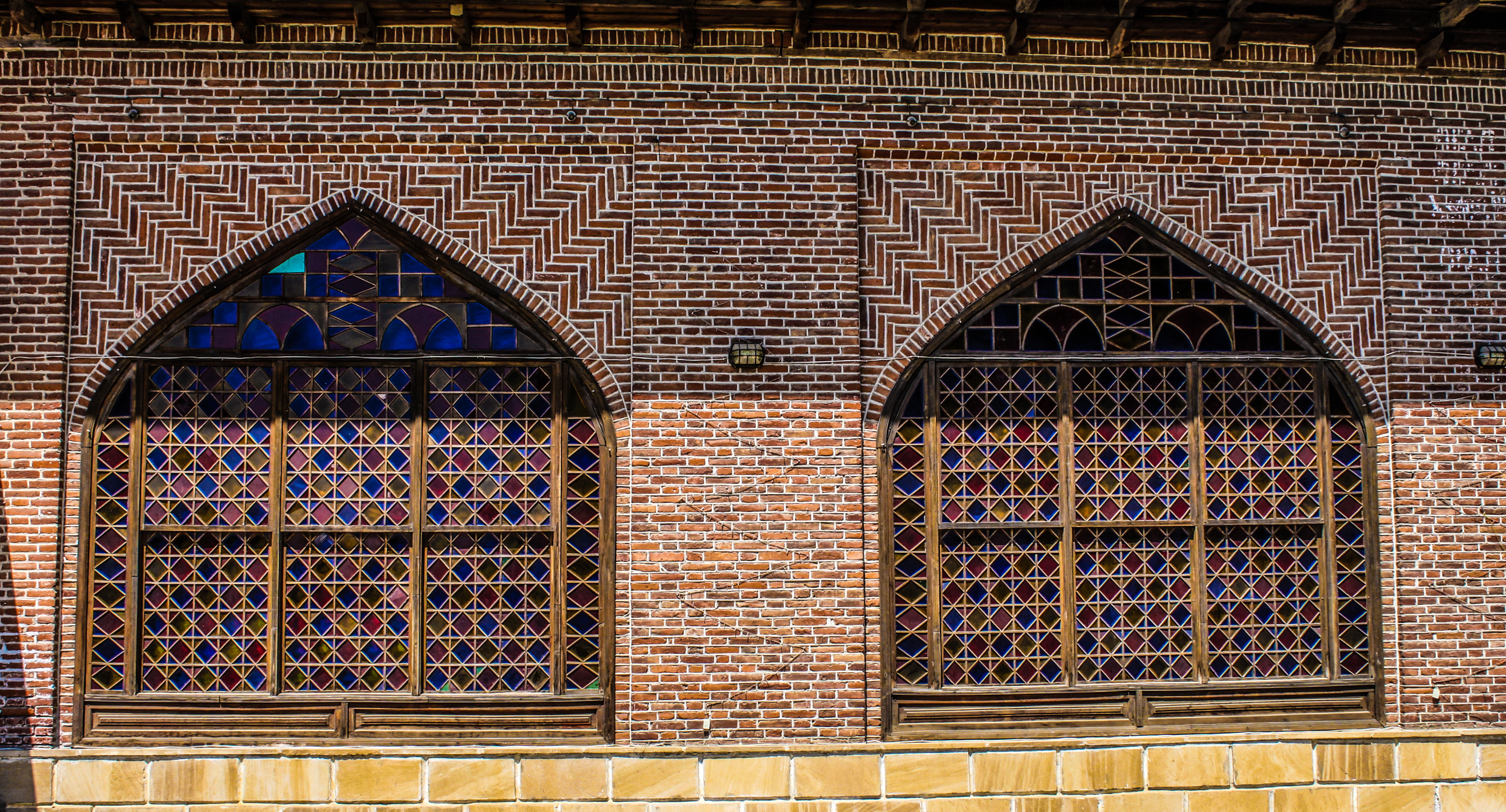
Details of the mosque façade

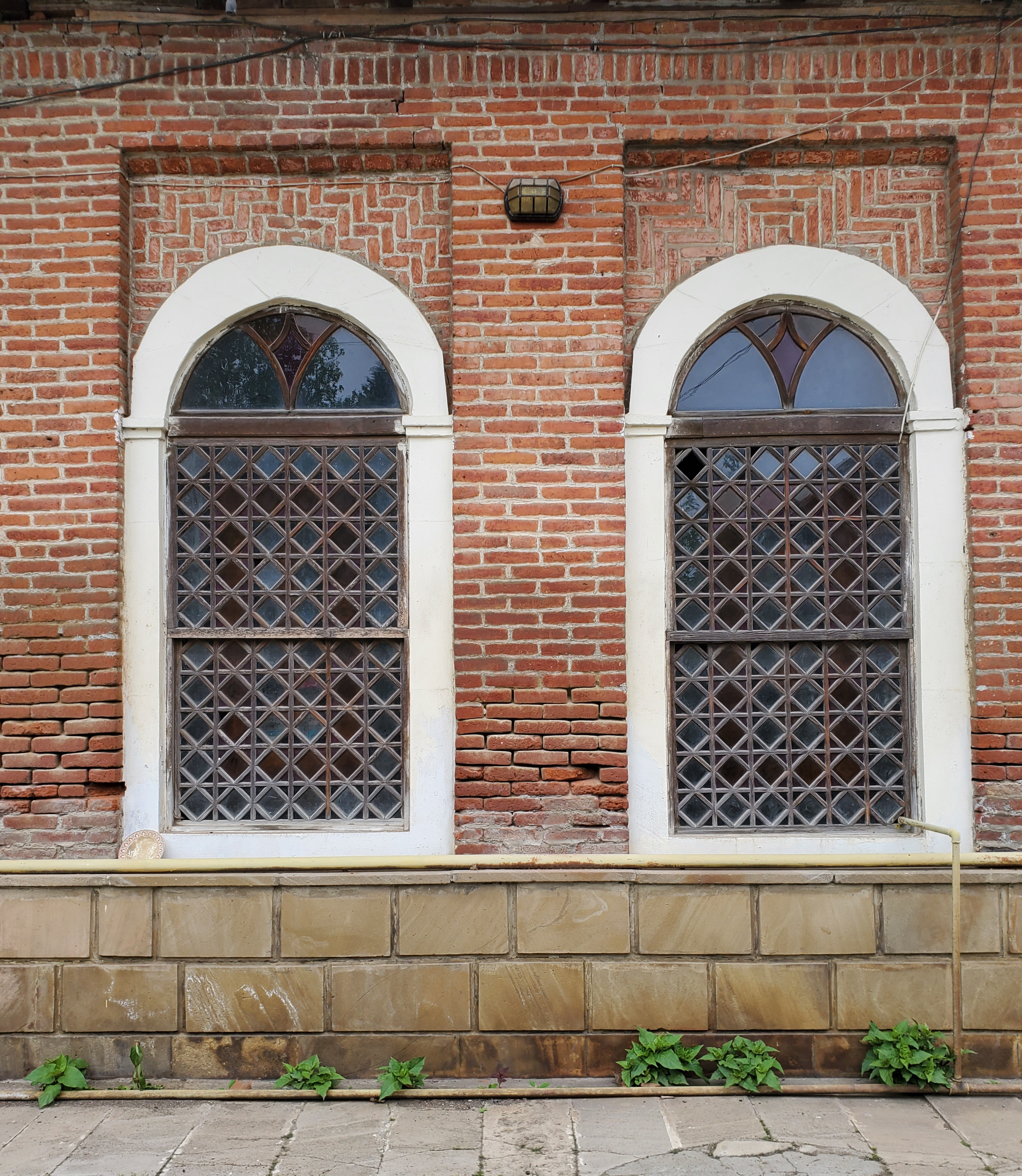
Takya of Haji Hajiagi Akbarov

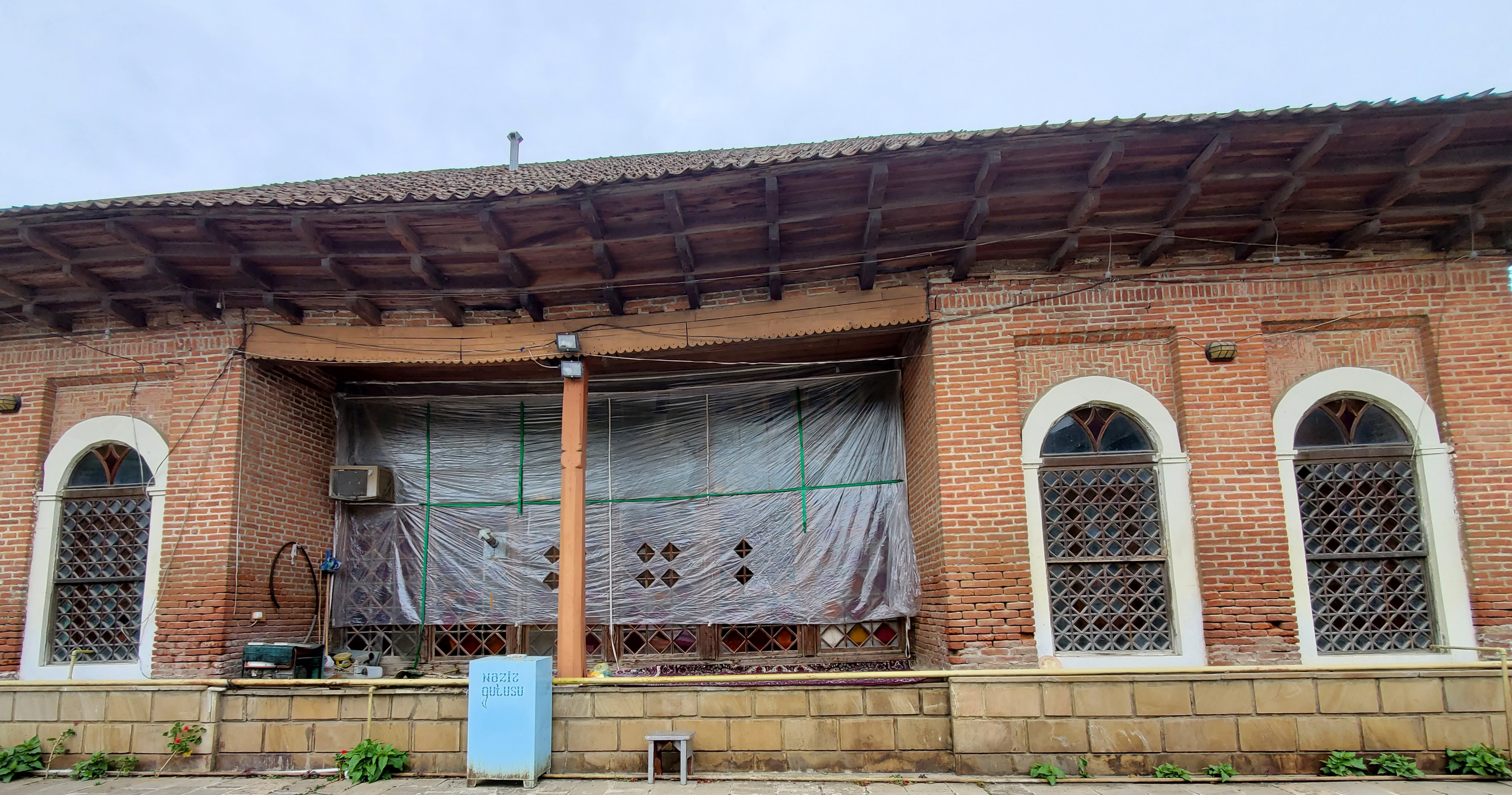
Takya of Haji Hajiagi Akbarov

== See also ==
- Shia Islam in Azerbaijan
- List of mosques in Azerbaijan
