= Şuvaş =

- Village
- Location within Azerbaijan
- Coordinates: 38°27′N 48°47′E
- Country: Azerbaijan
- Rayon: Astara
- Municipality: Səncərədi
- Time zone: UTC+4 (AZT)

Şuvaş (also, Shuash and Shuvash) is a village in the Astara Rayon of Azerbaijan. The village forms part of the municipality of Səncərədi.
