= Kichik Bazar Mosque =

Mosque in Lankaran, Azerbaijan

- Azerbaijani: Kiçik Bazar Məscidi
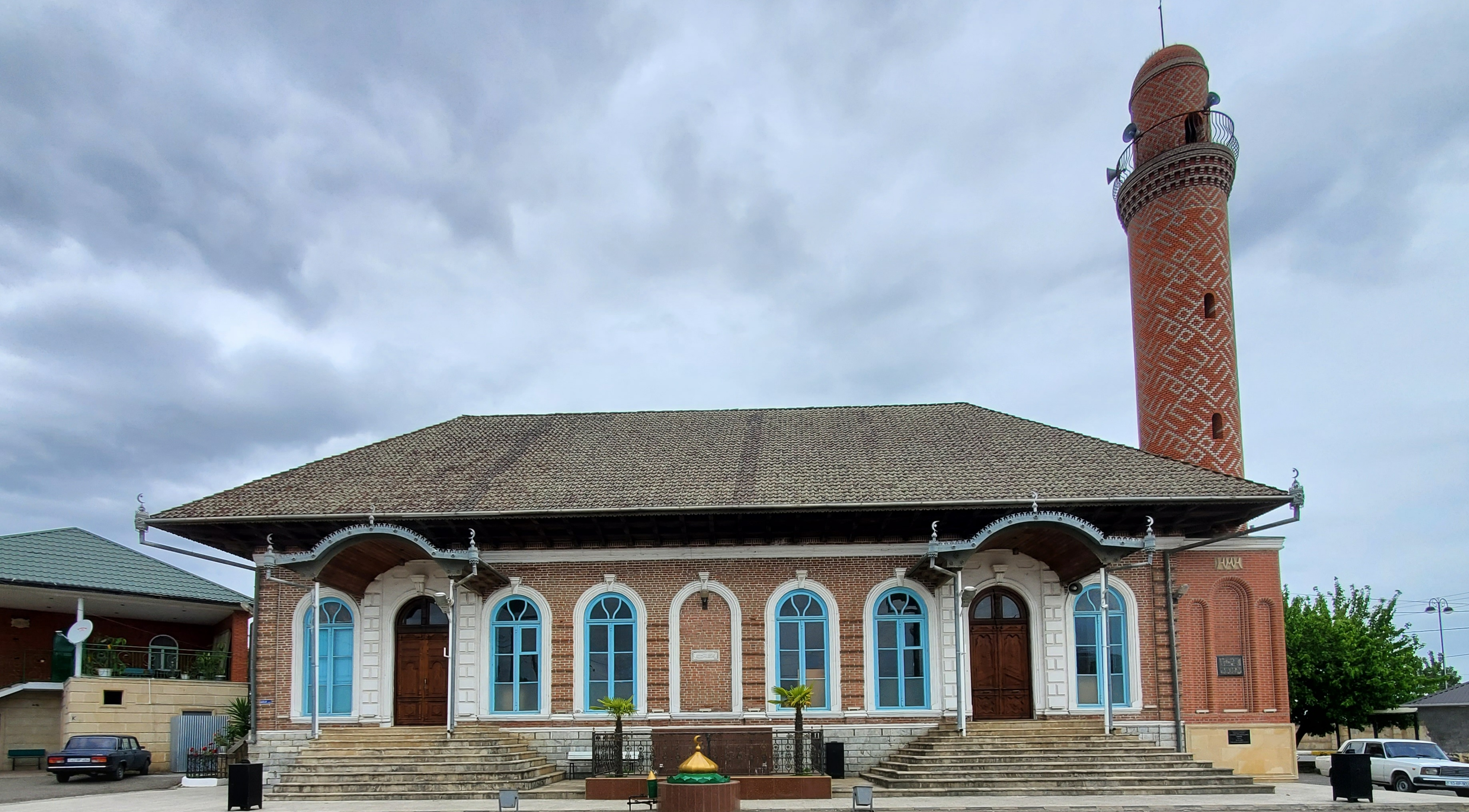
- The mosque in 2021

- Location of the mosque in Azerbaijan

Religion
- Affiliation: Shia Islam
- Ecclesiastical or organisational status: Mosque (1906–1928); Profane use (1928–1992); Mosque (since c. 1992)
- Status: Active

Location
- Location: Kiçik Bazar, Lankaran
- Country: Azerbaijan
- Coordinates: 38°46′N 48°51′E

Architecture
- Type: Mosque architecture
- Style: Islamic
- Completed: 1904

Specifications
- Capacity: 250 worshippers
- Length: 26 m (85 ft)
- Width: 10 m (33 ft)
- Minaret: One
- Minaret height: 24 m (79 ft)
- Materials: Bricks; timber; tiles

The Kichik Bazar Mosque (Azerbaijani: Kiçik Bazar Məscidi) is a Shia Islam mosque and historical architectural monument located in the center of the Lankaran district of Azerbaijan. The mosque was built in 1904.

By the order of the Cabinet of Ministers of the Republic of Azerbaijan dated 2 August 2001, the mosque was taken under the state protection as an architectural monument of history and culture of local importance (No. 4806).

== History ==
The Kichik Bazar Mosque was built in 1904 in the Kiçik Bazar neighborhood of Lankaran, funded by Taghı bey, Agha bey, Molla Nasir, and contributions from the city's residents. It takes its name from the neighborhood where it is located.

In Azerbaijan, the struggle against religion officially began in 1928 after the Soviet occupation. In December of that year, the Azerbaijan Communist Party Central Committee transferred many mosques, churches, and synagogues to the balance of clubs for educational purposes. If there were 3,000 mosques in Azerbaijan in 1917, by 1927 this number had decreased to 1,700, and by 1933, only 17 remained. The Kichik Bazar Mosque was closed, and the nearby Guldeste minaret was demolished. The mosque building was used as a warehouse.

After Azerbaijan regained independence, by the decision of the Cabinet of Azerbaijan No. 132 dated August 2, 2001, the mosque was included in the list of local significant immovable historical and cultural monuments.

== Architecture ==
The architect of the mosque was the skilled craftsman Rahim and his father. During the construction of the mosque, a minaret, known as Guldeste, was also built nearby. The walls of the mosque are 26 m (85 ft) long, 10 m (33 ft) wide, 8 m (26 ft) high, and 1 m (3 ft 3 in) thick. The mosque can accommodate up to 250 worshippers simultaneously. Red bricks, local wood materials, and tiles were used in the construction of the mosque. The left door of the mosque was prepared by Mahammadhasan Naccar, a member of the "Fovcul-fusaha" literary circle active in Lankaran in the 19th century, while the right door was prepared by the master craftsman Mahammadali.

The 24 m-high (79 ft) minaret of the mosque was restored in 2010 via an initiative of the local community.

Both men and women can worship in the mosque, with a separate entrance for women, and a two-story section dedicated to their worship.

== Gallery ==
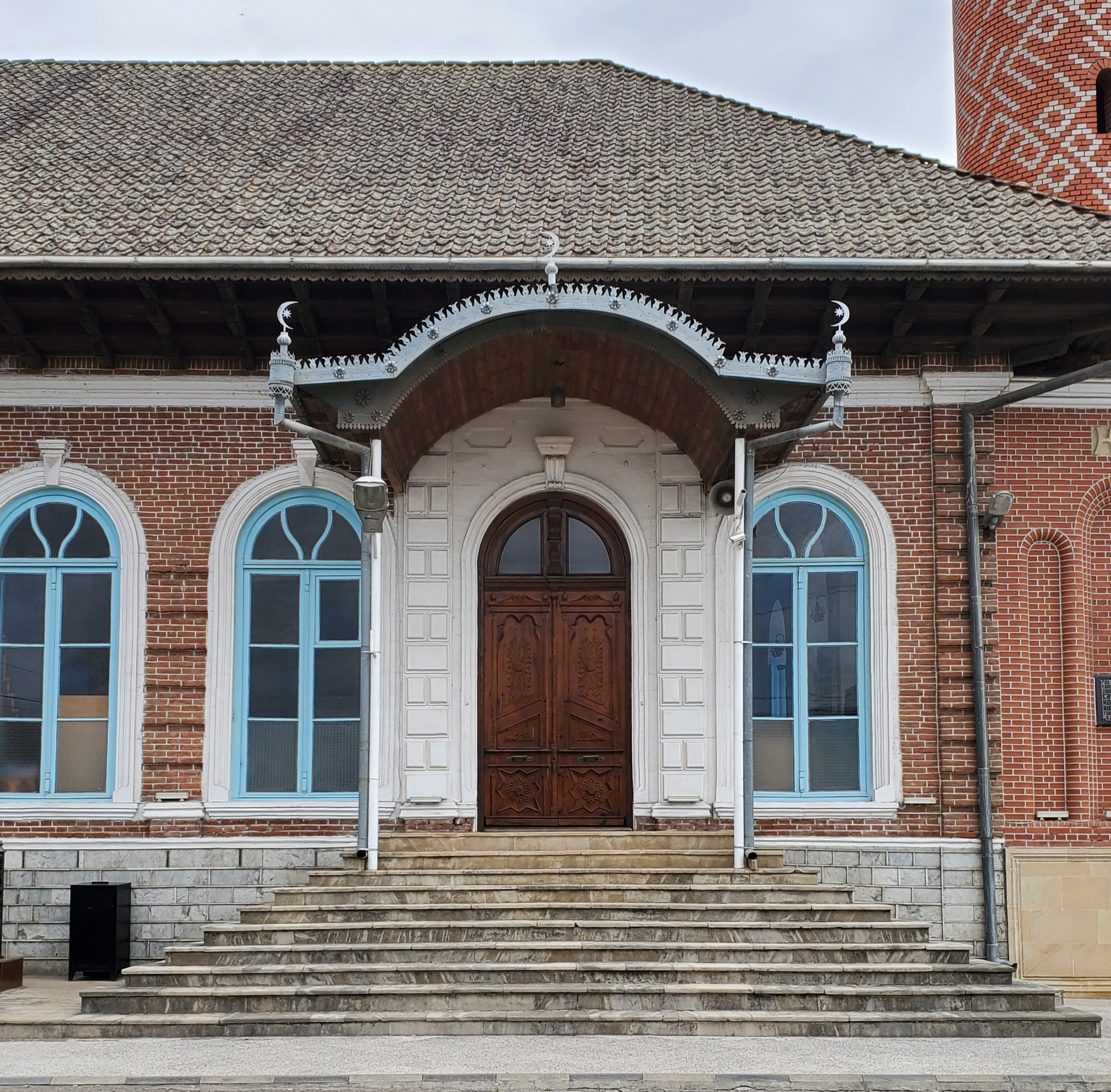

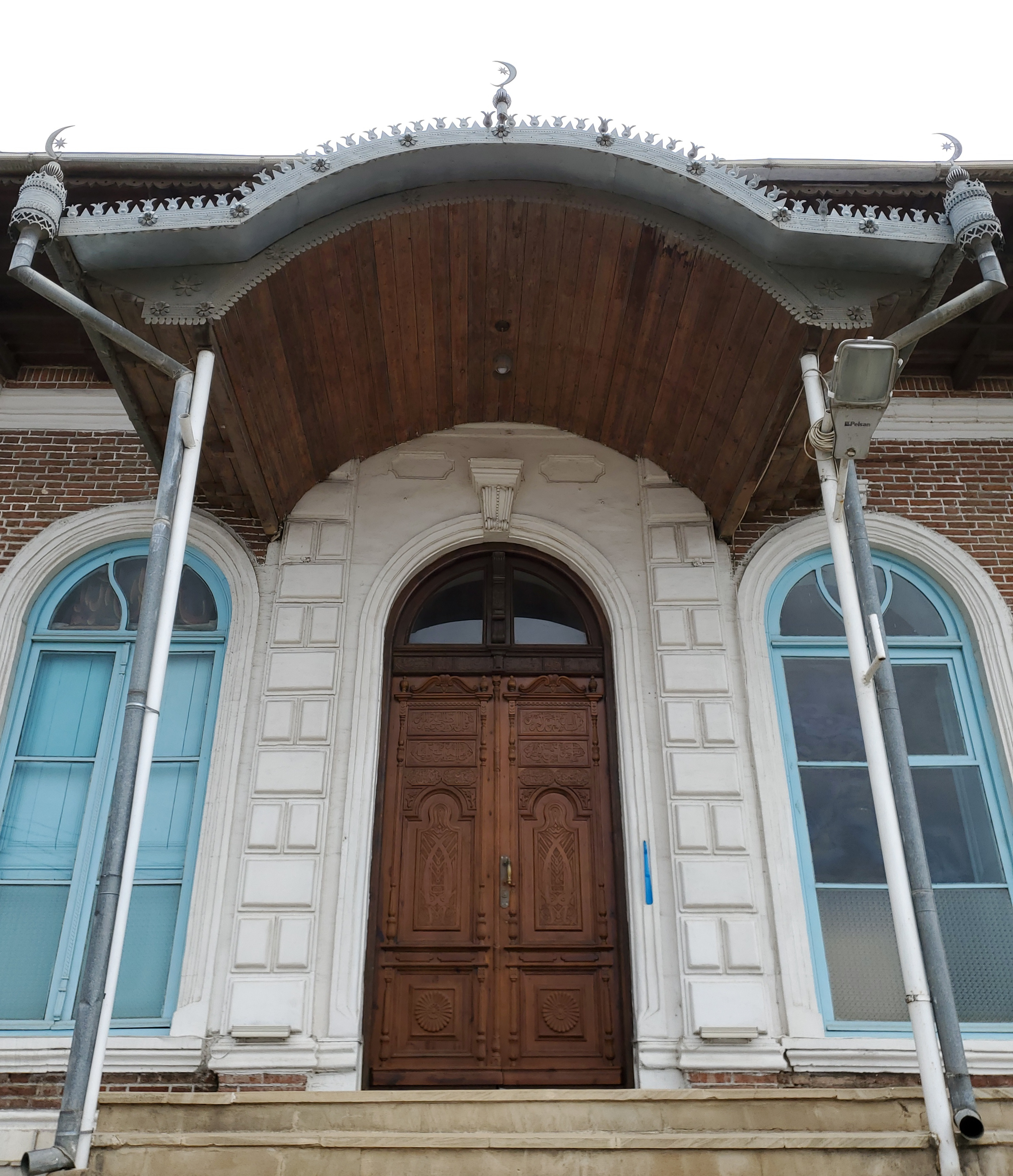

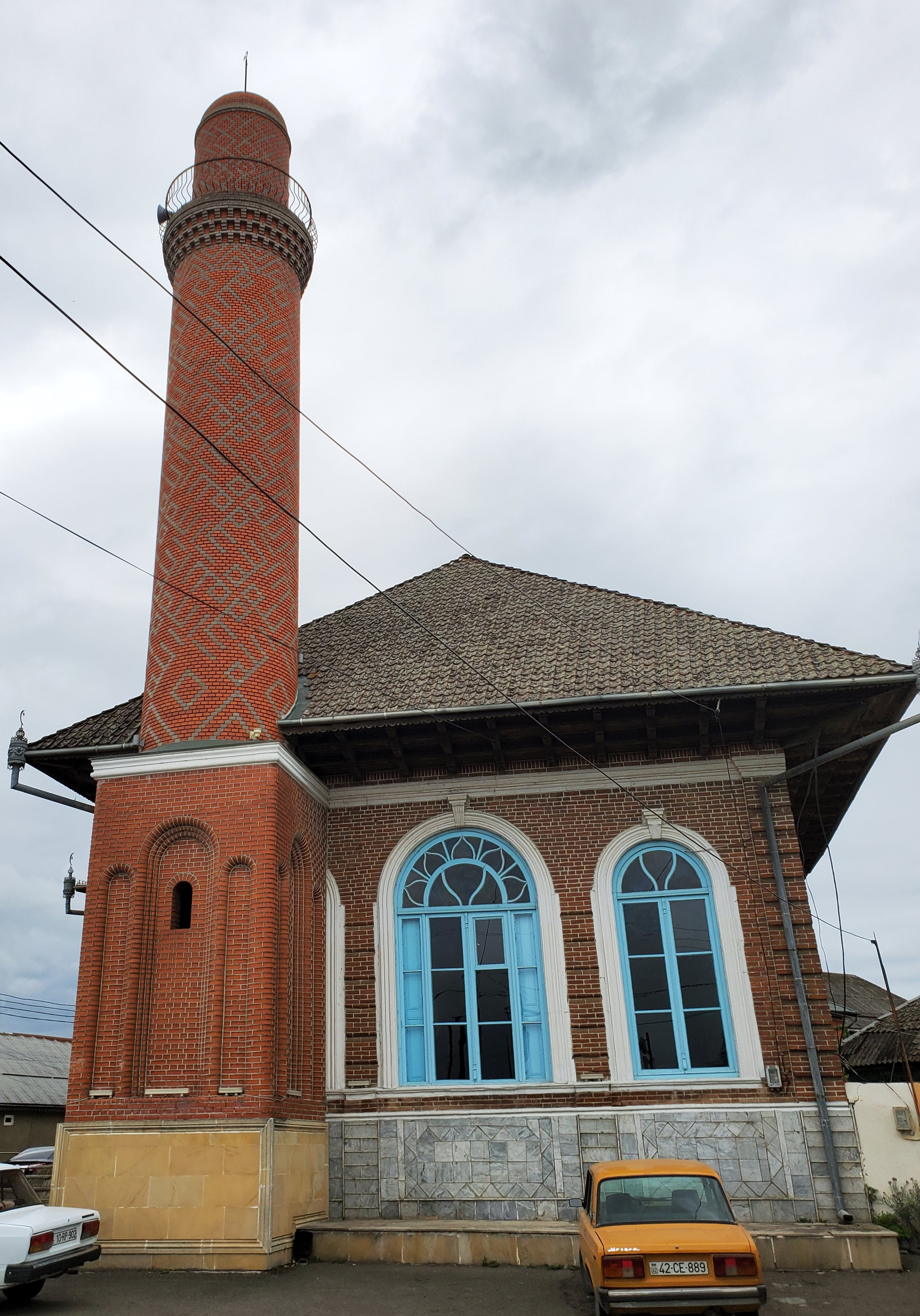

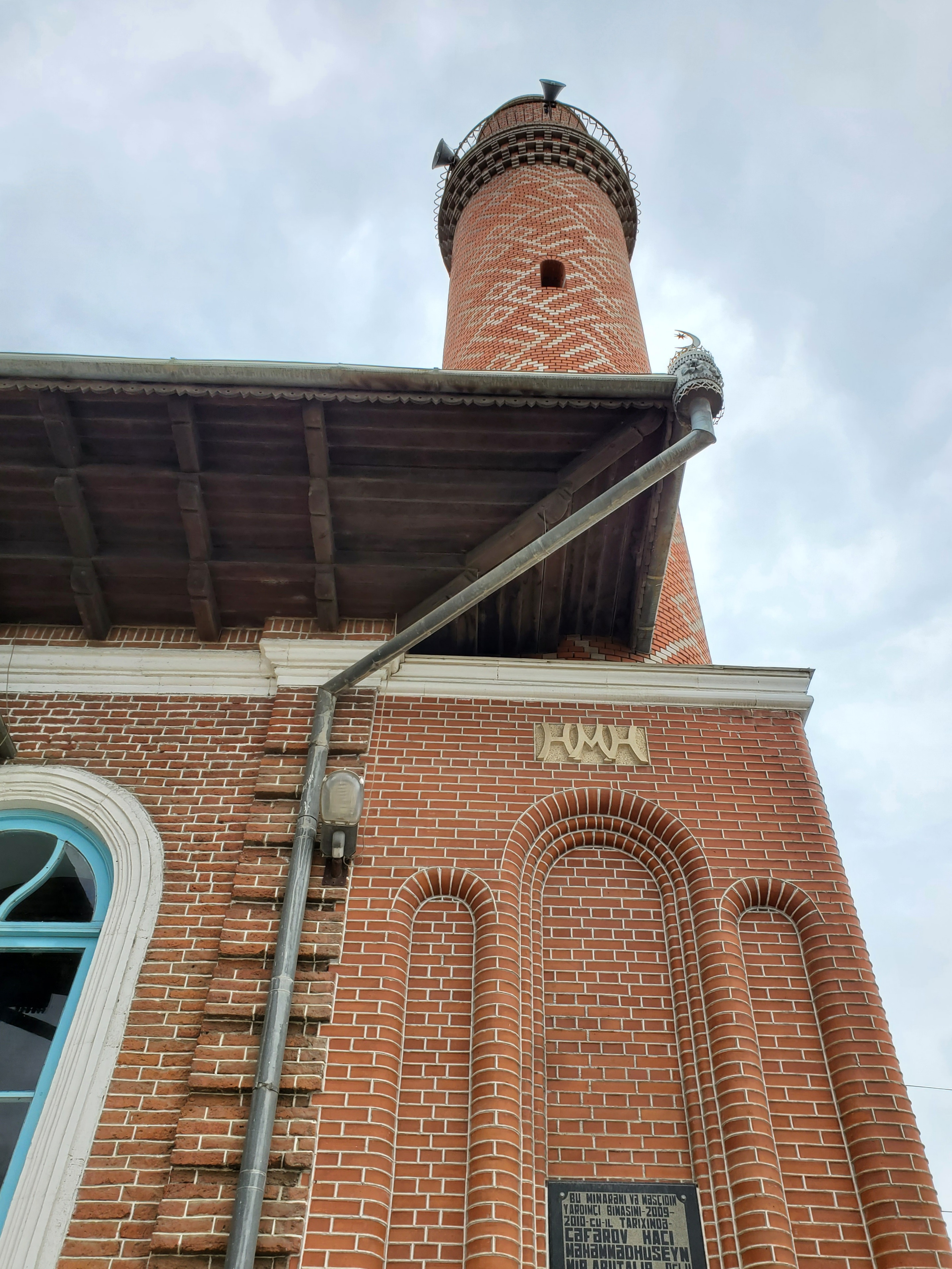

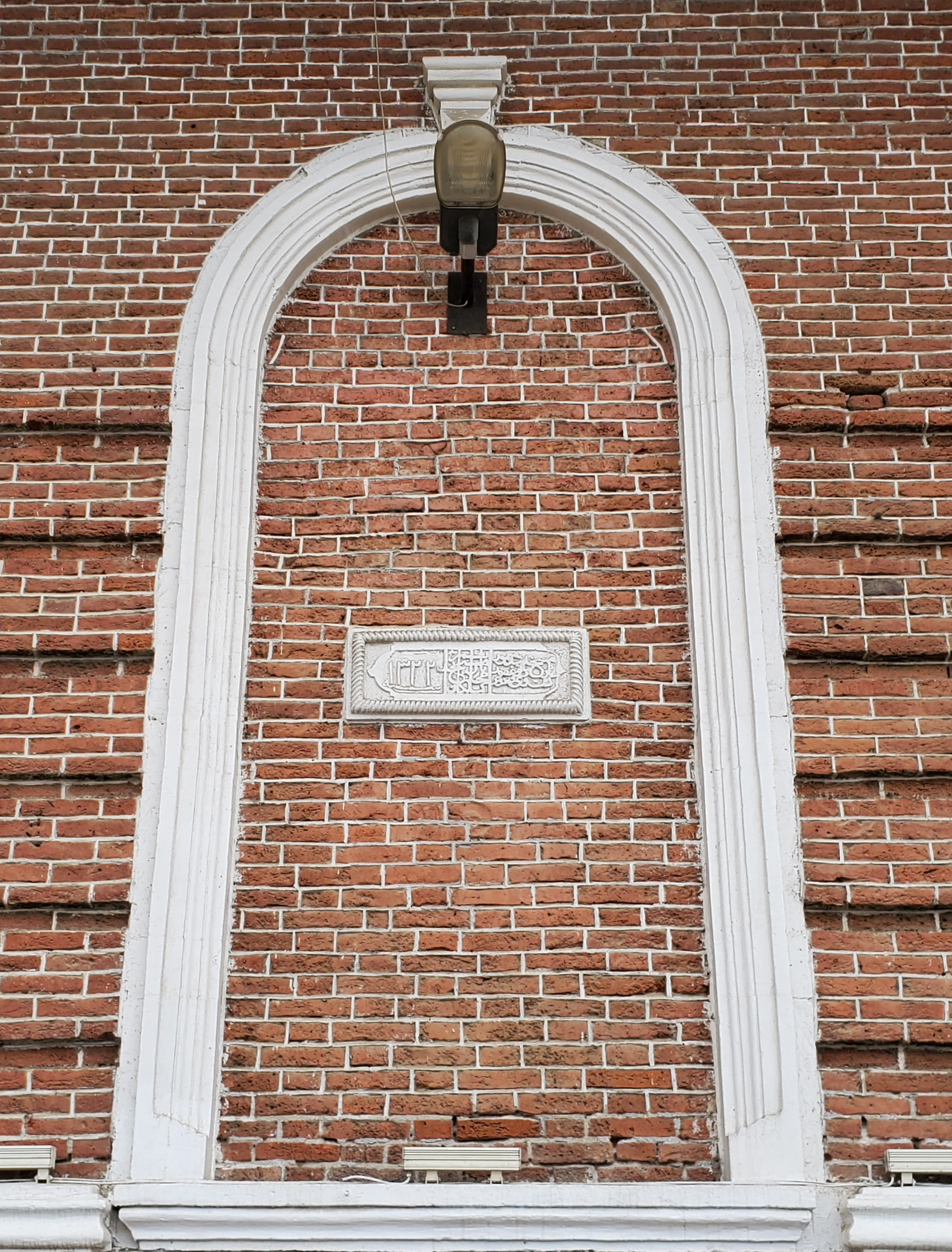

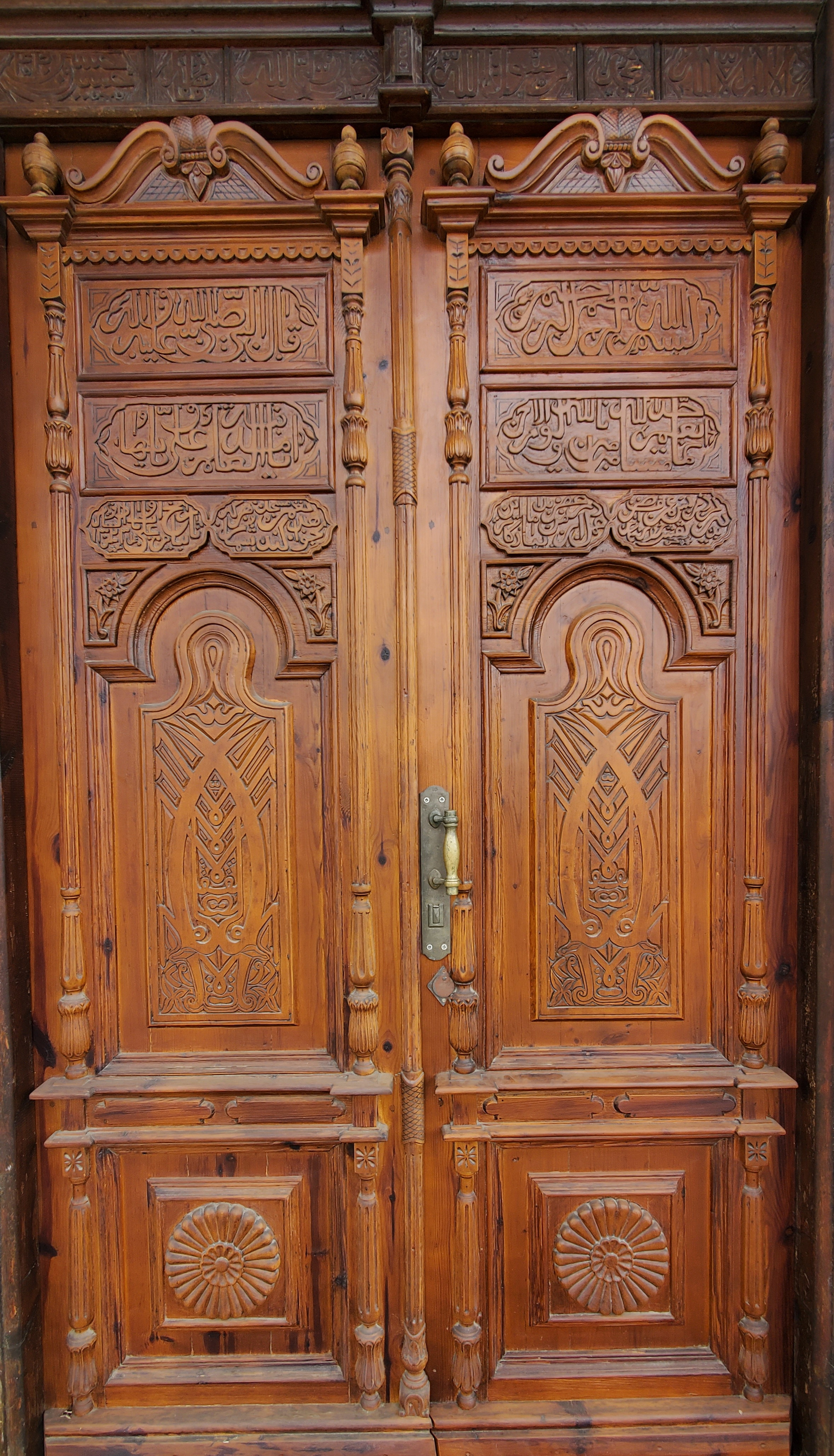

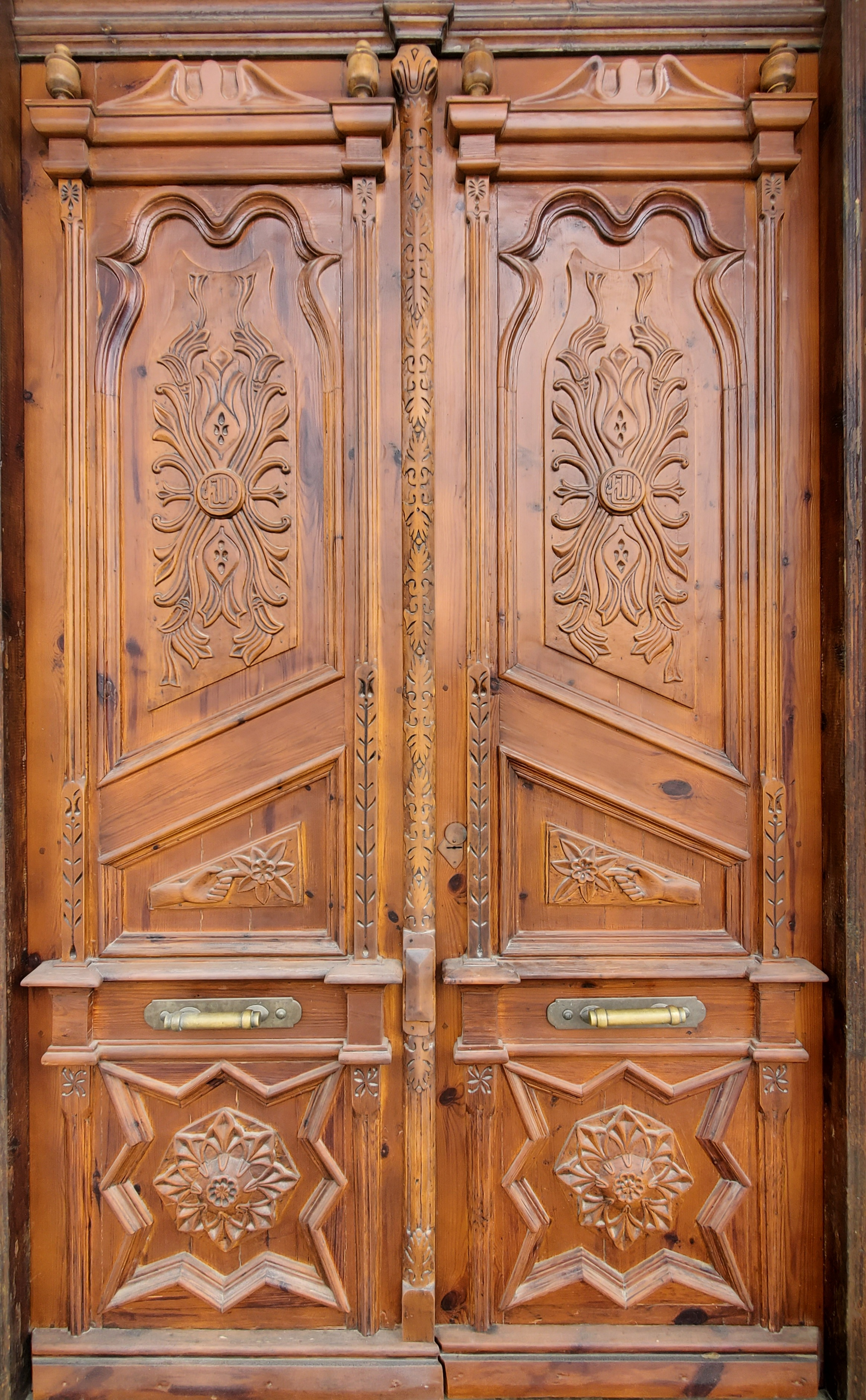

== See also ==
- Shia Islam in Azerbaijan
- List of mosques in Azerbaijan
