= Lankaran =

Lankaran Lənkəran
- City
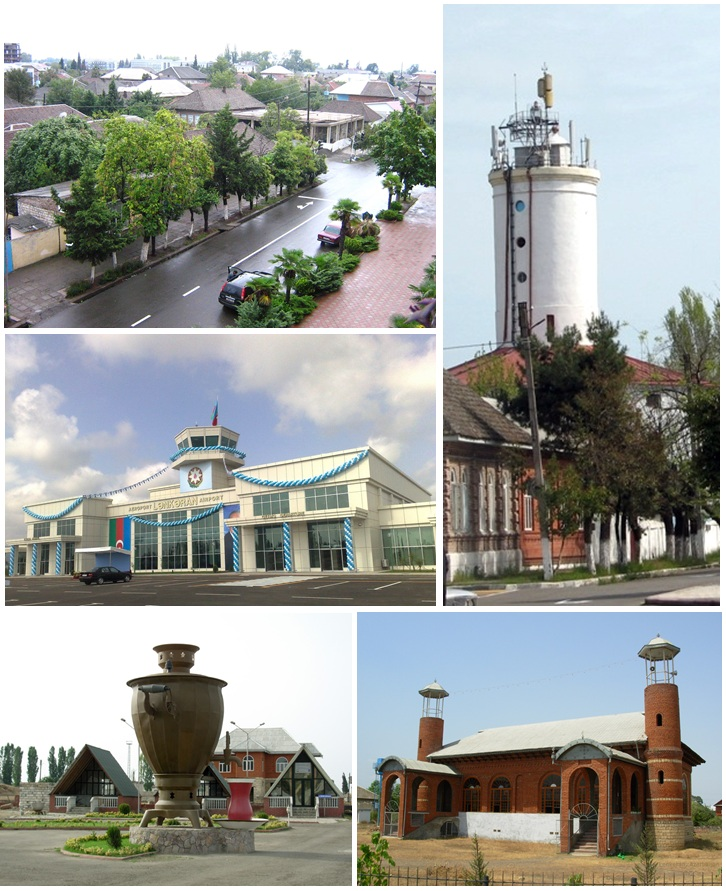

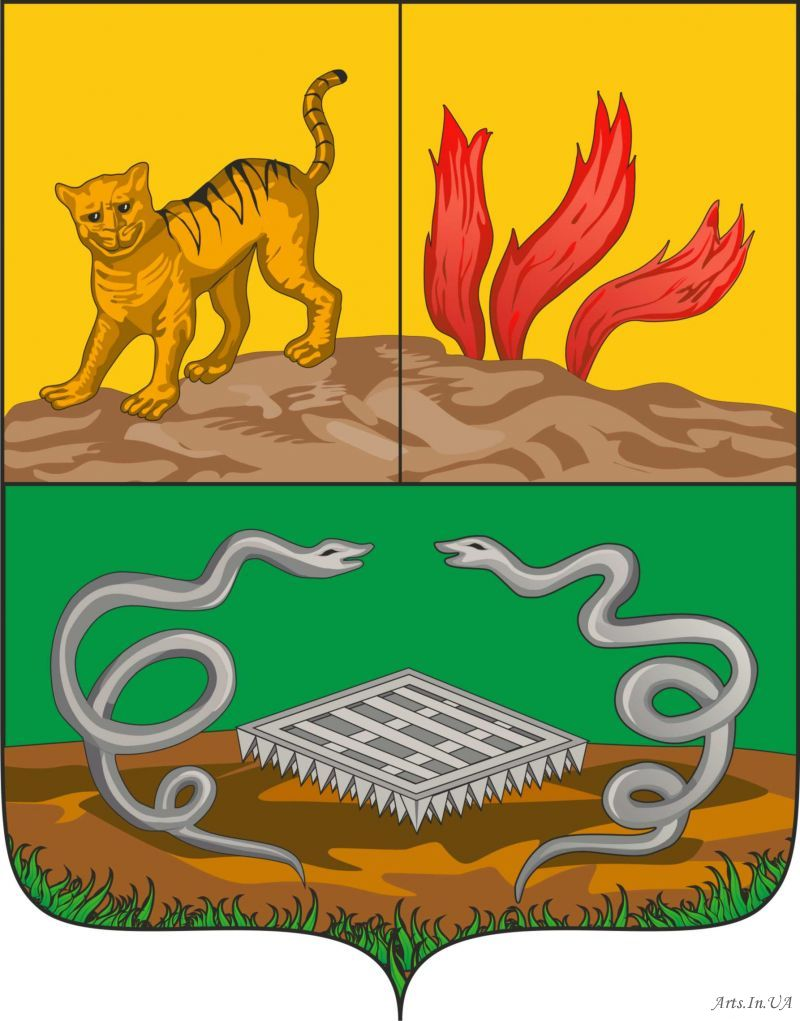
- Seal

- Coordinates: 38°45′13″N 48°51′04″E
- Country: Azerbaijan
- Region: Lankaran-Astara

Government
  - Governor: Taleh Qaraşov

Area
  - Total: 70 km^{2} (27 sq mi)

Population (2021)
  - Total: 89,300
- Time zone: UTC+4 (AZT)
- Area code: +994 025 25
- Website: lenkeran-ih.gov.az

Lankaran (Azerbaijani: Lənkəran,) is a city in Azerbaijan, on the coast of the Caspian Sea, near the southern border with Iran. As of 2021, the city had a population of 89,300. It is next to, but independent of, Lankaran District. The city forms a distinct first-order division of Azerbaijan.

== Etymology ==
The origin of the name "Lankaran" is uncertain. One theory consider it to derive from one of the Persian words, Langarkunān ("the place for dropping the anchor(s)") or Langarkanān ("the place for weighing anchor(s)"). Both meanings simply translate as "sea port." The pronunciation has shifted through the years, and Langarkunān became Lankarān or, in the even more simple Talysh pronunciation, Lankon. Another theory links it to the Talysh word lankran ("cane house").

== History ==
It is unknown when the town of Lankaran was actually established. The French archaeologist Jacques de Morgan (died 1924) discovered extremely ancient remains in Lankaran, such as dolmens, graves, and instances of bodies seemingly exposed in a Zoroastrian manner.

With the death of Nader Shah (r. 1736–1747), the Talysh Khanate was founded by Seyyed Abbas, whose ancestors were members of the Iranian Safavid dynasty, and had moved into the Talish region in the 1720s during a turbulent period in Iranian history. From the founding of the khanate until 1828, it was under the suzerainty of the Iranian Zand and Qajar dynasties. In the first half of the 18th century, the Russians gained control over it for a few years during the Russo-Persian War of 1722–1723; in 1732 it was ceded back to Iran by the Treaty of Resht. During the Russo-Persian War of 1804–1813, General Kotlyarevsky, heading the southernmost Russian contingent during the war, stormed and captured Lankaran's fortress. Following the Treaty of Gulistan of 1813, it was ceded to Russia. Qajar Iran retook the city during the Russo-Persian War of 1826–1828, but was forced to return it following the Treaty of Turkmenchay (1828), which saw the definite end of Persian influence in the South Caucasus.

Under Russian rule, Lankaran, known as Lenkoran (Ленкорань) in Russian, was the center of the Lenkoran Uyezd of the Baku Governorate. Following the collapse of the Russian Empire, it was a part of the short-lived Azerbaijan Democratic Republic (1918–1920), then became a part of the Azerbaijan Soviet Socialist Republic following the sovietization of Azerbaijan. In 1991, following the dissolution of the Soviet Union, it became a part of independent Azerbaijan. After a short while, during Nagorno-Karabakh conflict The city was the capital of the Talysh-Mughan Autonomous Republic.

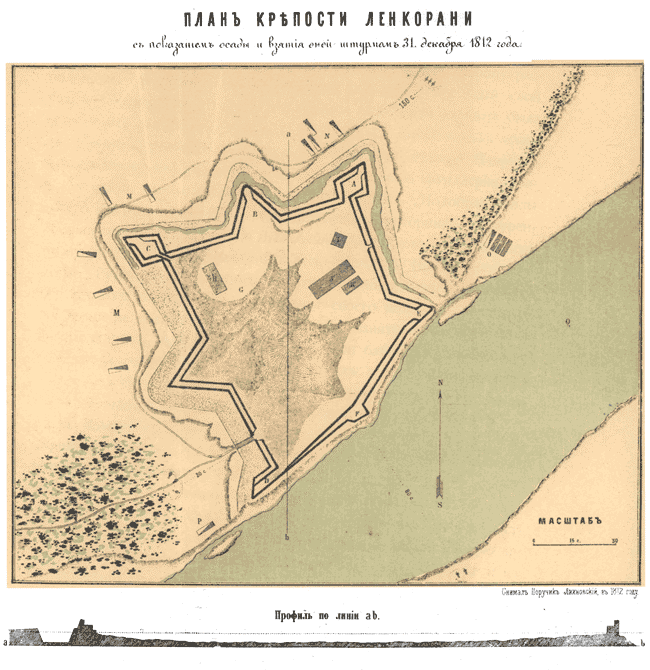
Lankaran’s Fortress Plan in 19th Century

== Geography ==
There are sandy beaches near Lankaran. Thermal sulphide, chloride, sodium-calcium waters of Andjin (Upper and Lower) mineral springs are situated 12 km west of the town. Also to the west are the ruins of Ballabur castle, near the village with the same name.

Vast area of this region is covered by national parks, where a variety of fauna and flora are preserved. Gizil-Agach State Reserve hosts over 250 kinds of plants, 30 species of fish and more than 220 kinds of birds. Lankaran is also known for Lankaran Jullibrissin, Parrotia, or ironwood. It is naturally grown in the region and could be seen in Hirkan National Park. Local myth has it that it is the only wood that sinks in water, hence the name (ironwood). Historically it has been used for heating since it burns for a long time and is not easily extinguished. The Persian leopard (Panthera pardus saxicolous) subspecies of the leopard, lives in the national park as well. In 1937, members of the Opilio lepidus species of harvestman were sighted in the area.

To Northwest of Lankaran, there is a narrow Peninsula called Sara Peninsula. History of the area indicates that it once used to be an island near wetlands of Lankaran. But due to sea levels, the nearby coasts increased and a section to the Island was built in 1960.

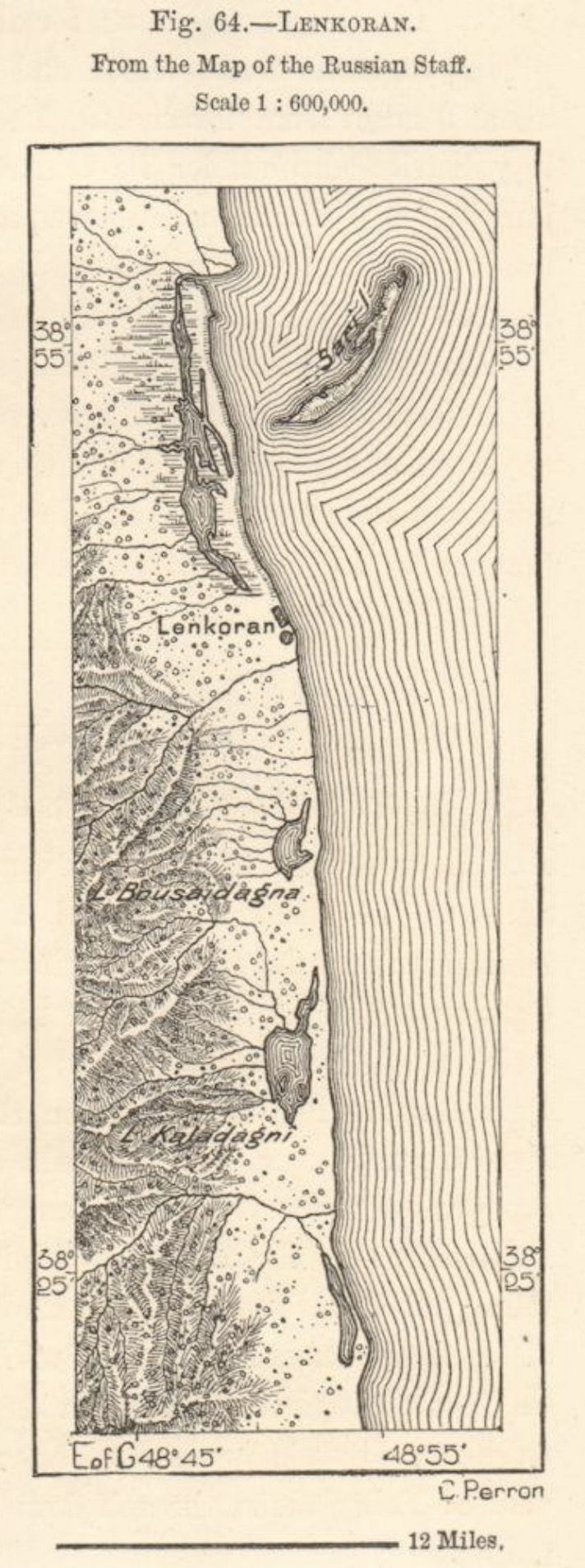
Lankaran’s Old Geographic map

=== Climate ===
Lankaran has a borderline humid subtropical (Köppen climate classification: Cfa) and hot-summer mediterranean climate (Köppen climate classification: Csa), with cool, wet winters and very warm, highly humid summers, albeit with infrequent rain.

The Humid subtropical climate - characterized by mild winters, hot and dry summer days, and a rainy autumn—has shaped the region's rich flora and fauna. Rivers such as the Lankaranchay, Veravul, Qumbashi, and Boladi swell in spring and autumn, primarily due to rainfall, while in summer they become calm and significantly shallower. Consequently, the Khanbulanchay reservoir was constructed in the area to irrigate agricultural crops.

Climate data for Lankaran (1991–2020 normals)
Month	Jan	Feb	Mar	Apr	May	Jun	Jul	Aug	Sep	Oct	Nov	Dec	Year
Mean daily maximum °C (°F)	8.7 (47.7)	9.1 (48.4)	12.4 (54.3)	16.9 (62.4)	23.0 (73.4)	28.1 (82.6)	30.7 (87.3)	30.6 (87.1)	26.1 (79.0)	20.8 (69.4)	14.4 (57.9)	10.1 (50.2)	19.2 (66.6)
Daily mean °C (°F)	5.3 (41.5)	5.8 (42.4)	8.9 (48.0)	13.2 (55.8)	18.9 (66.0)	23.6 (74.5)	26.3 (79.3)	26.1 (79.0)	22.2 (72.0)	17.2 (63.0)	11.1 (52.0)	6.8 (44.2)	15.4 (59.8)
Mean daily minimum °C (°F)	1.9 (35.4)	2.5 (36.5)	5.4 (41.7)	9.5 (49.1)	14.8 (58.6)	19.2 (66.6)	21.9 (71.4)	21.6 (70.9)	18.4 (65.1)	13.5 (56.3)	7.8 (46.0)	3.6 (38.5)	11.7 (53.0)
Average precipitation mm (inches)	91 (3.6)	114 (4.5)	90 (3.5)	50 (2.0)	54 (2.1)	22 (0.9)	17 (0.7)	50 (2.0)	143 (5.6)	259 (10.2)	168 (6.6)	88 (3.5)	1,146 (45.2)
Average precipitation days (≥ 1.0 mm)	9.7	8.8	10.4	7.8	6.9	3.5	1.8	3.6	7.9	12.7	10.1	8.2	91.4
Mean monthly sunshine hours	105.4	98.9	124.0	171.0	226.3	282.0	306.9	254.2	189.0	127.1	99.0	108.5	2,092.3
Source 1: NOAA (Precipitation 1971–1990) Climi e viaggi
Source 2: Hong Kong Observatory (sun only)

== Economy ==
Dominating spheres in the economy of Lankaran are vegetable-growing, tea-growing, paddy cultivating, cattle-breeding, citrus plants, beekeeping, fishing, and grain farming. Favourable humid subtropical climate, availability of good arable land, water and sufficient labour resources of the city provides a good basis for agricultural activities as well as the development of agro-processing enterprises. The city is also home to Azerbaijan's first tea plant, built in 1937.

== Demographics ==
Lankaran is the capital of the Talysh region (Talyshistan), the ethnic homeland of the Talysh people, and the main urban and cultural center of this people.

The vast majority of the population of Lankaran is Talysh, and the rest are Azerbaijanis and other nationalities.

=== Religion ===
The religion with the largest community of followers is Islam. The majority of the Muslims are Shia Muslims, and the Republic of Azerbaijan has the second-highest Shia population percentage in the world after Iran. The city's notable mosques include Kichik Bazar Mosque and Boyuk Bazar Mosque.

== Culture ==
As of 2012, the city along with Baku and Ganja participated in Earth Hour movement.

=== Cuisine ===
Lankaran's cuisine has largely been affected by its multicultural history, hence the large variety of food originating during Talysh Khanate. Lankaran's signature cuisine includes Levengi, Lankaran kulcha, marji plov, white plov, pumpkin plov and turshu kebab.

=== Music and media ===
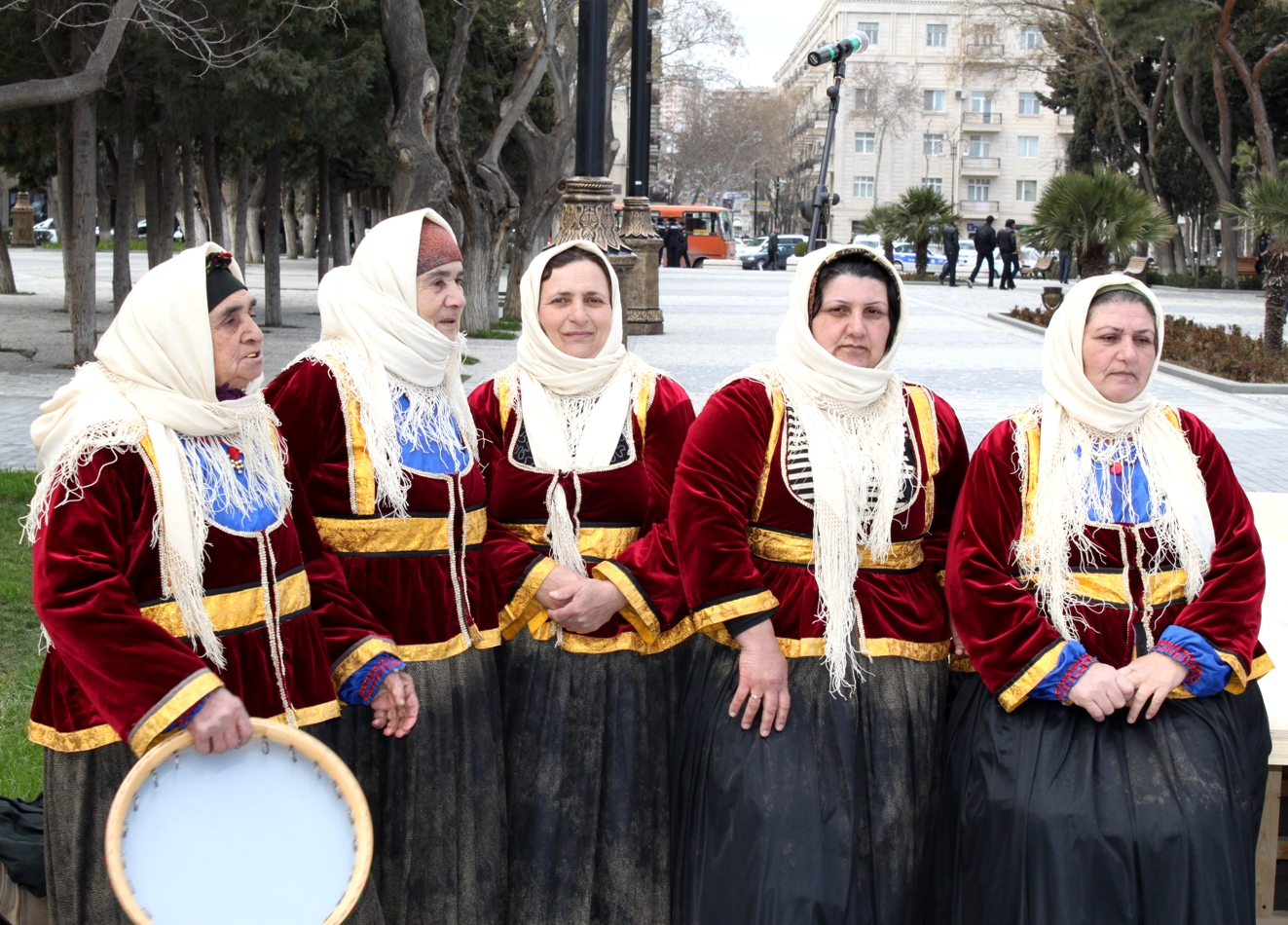
The Bajilar folk and dance collective

Lankaran is home to several national folk performers, including the Bacılar (The Sisters) national Talysh folk and dance collective.

The regional channel Janub TV and newspaper Lankaran are headquartered in the city.

=== Sports ===
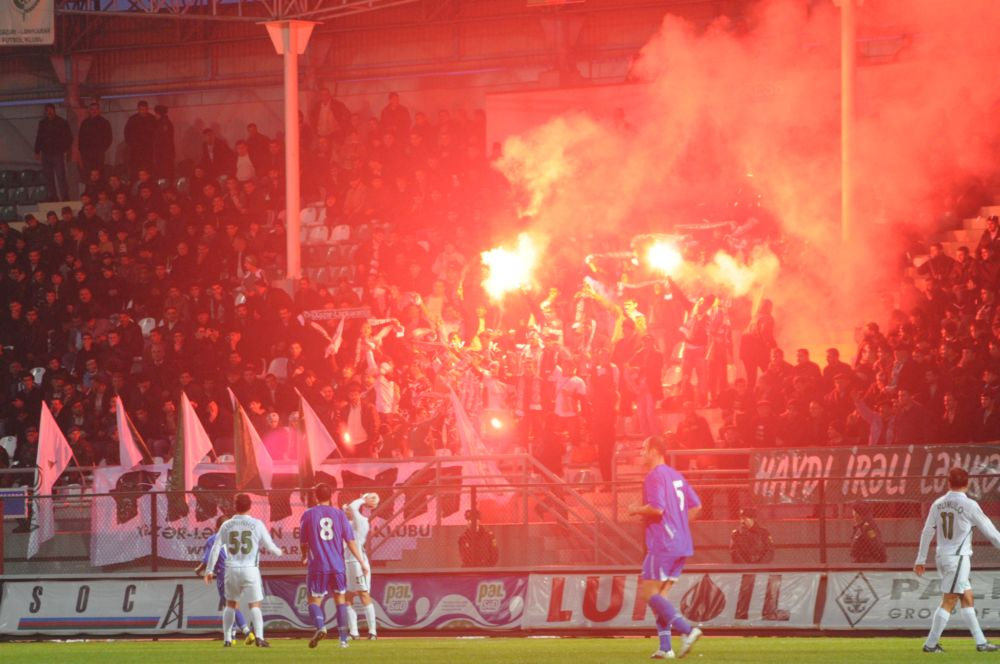
Khazar Lankaran fans in Lankaran City Stadium

The city used to have a professional football team competing in the top-flight of Azerbaijani football - Khazar Lankaran, which played in the Azerbaijan Premier League. Sporting venues in the city include the Lankaran City Stadium and Lankaran Olympic Sports Complex. The stadium was one of the venues for the group stages of the 2012 FIFA U-17 Women's World Cup.

In 2012, the city won to host European Masters Weightlifting Championship.

== Transport ==
=== Air ===
The Lankaran International Airport's international terminal was opened in September 2008.

=== Railway ===
The city has rail service from historic terminals in downtown to Baku in the east and Astara in the south.

== Education ==
Lankaran State University is located in the city. It was founded in 1991 and it was Lankaran's first university to start courses.

== Twin towns ==
Lankaran is twinned with:

- Monterey, United States (since 2011)
- Iskenderun, Turkey
- (Italy) Cerveteri, Italia (since 2013)

== Gallery ==
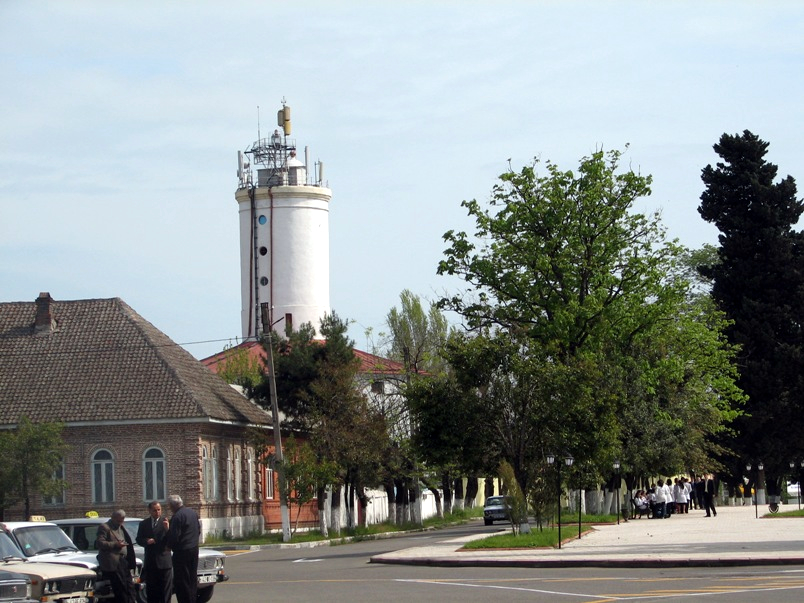
The central street of Lankaran

Lankaran Springs & Wellness Resort

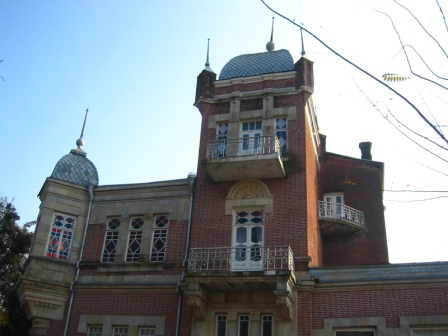
Khan Museum Lankaran, Azerbaijan

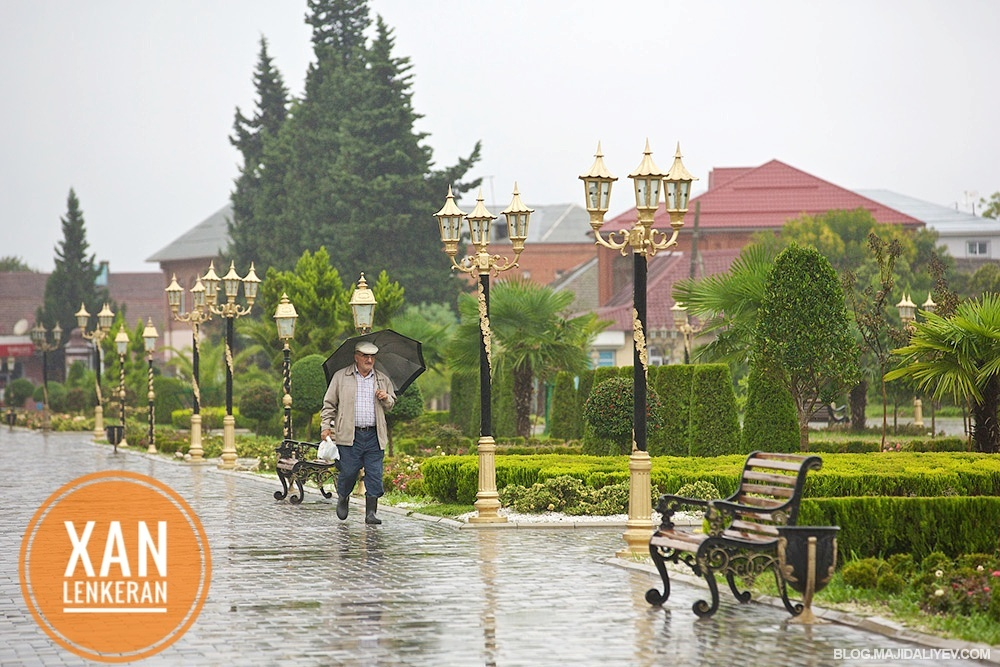
Dosa Park

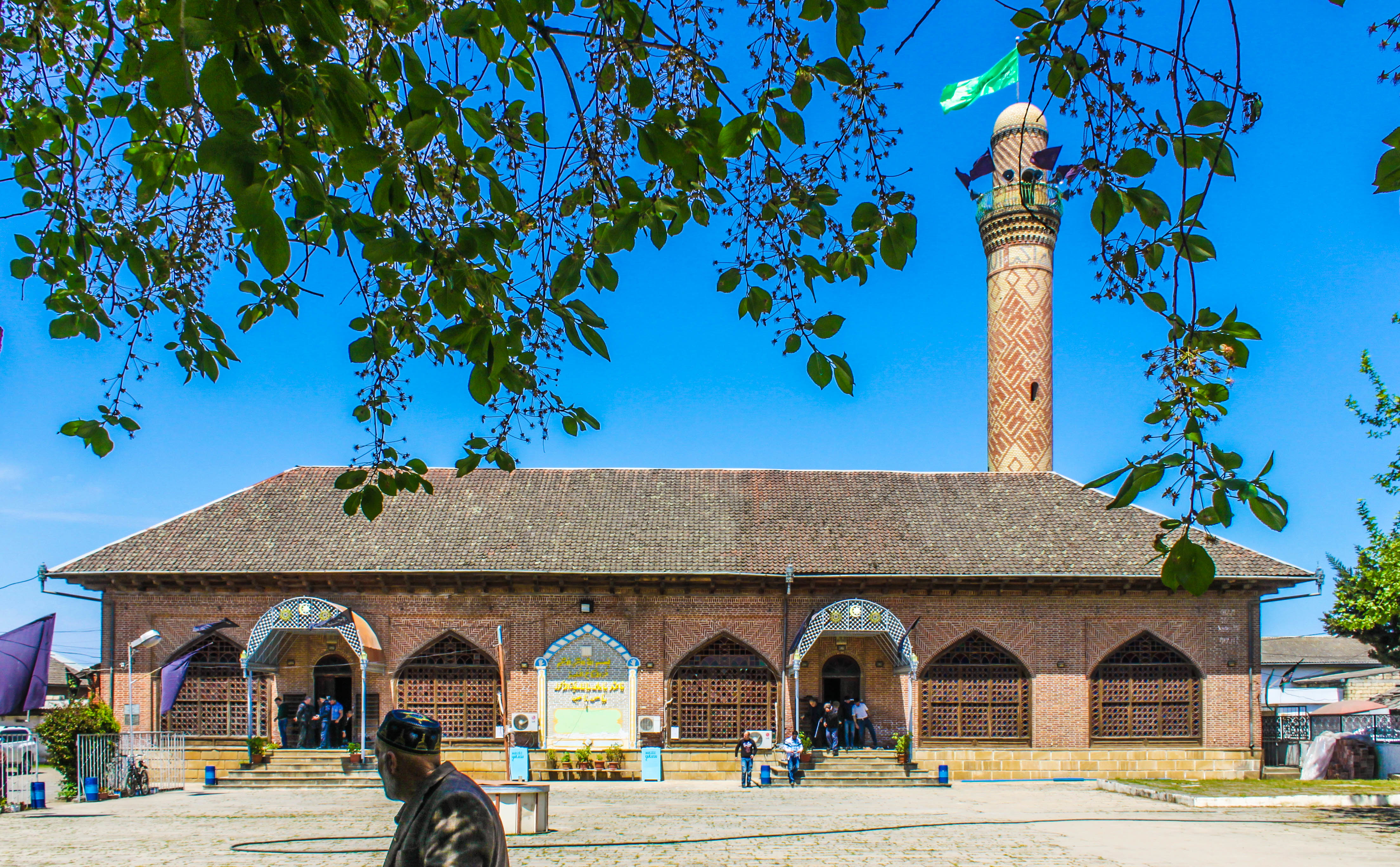
Boyuk Bazar Mosque

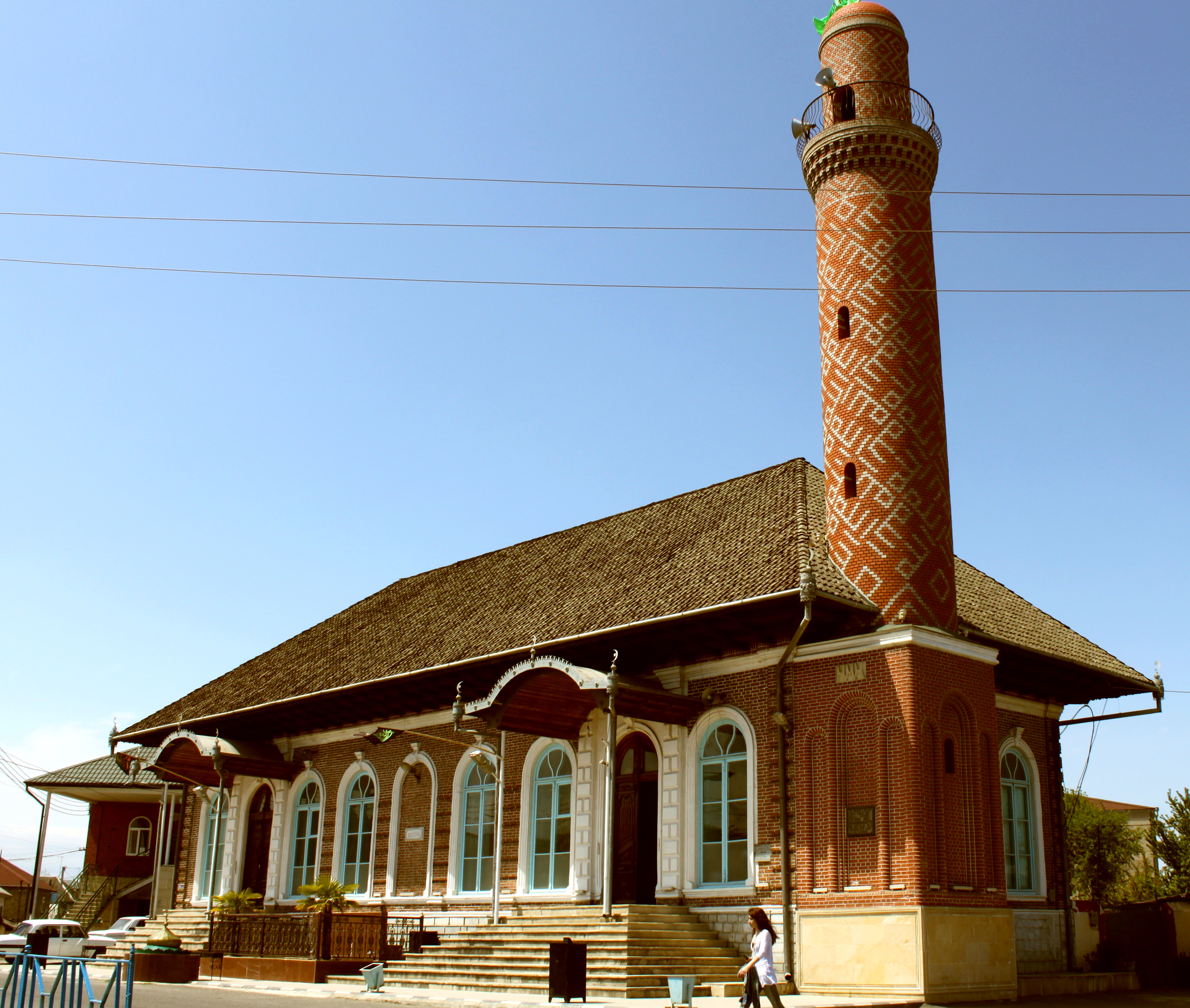
Kichik Bazar Mosque

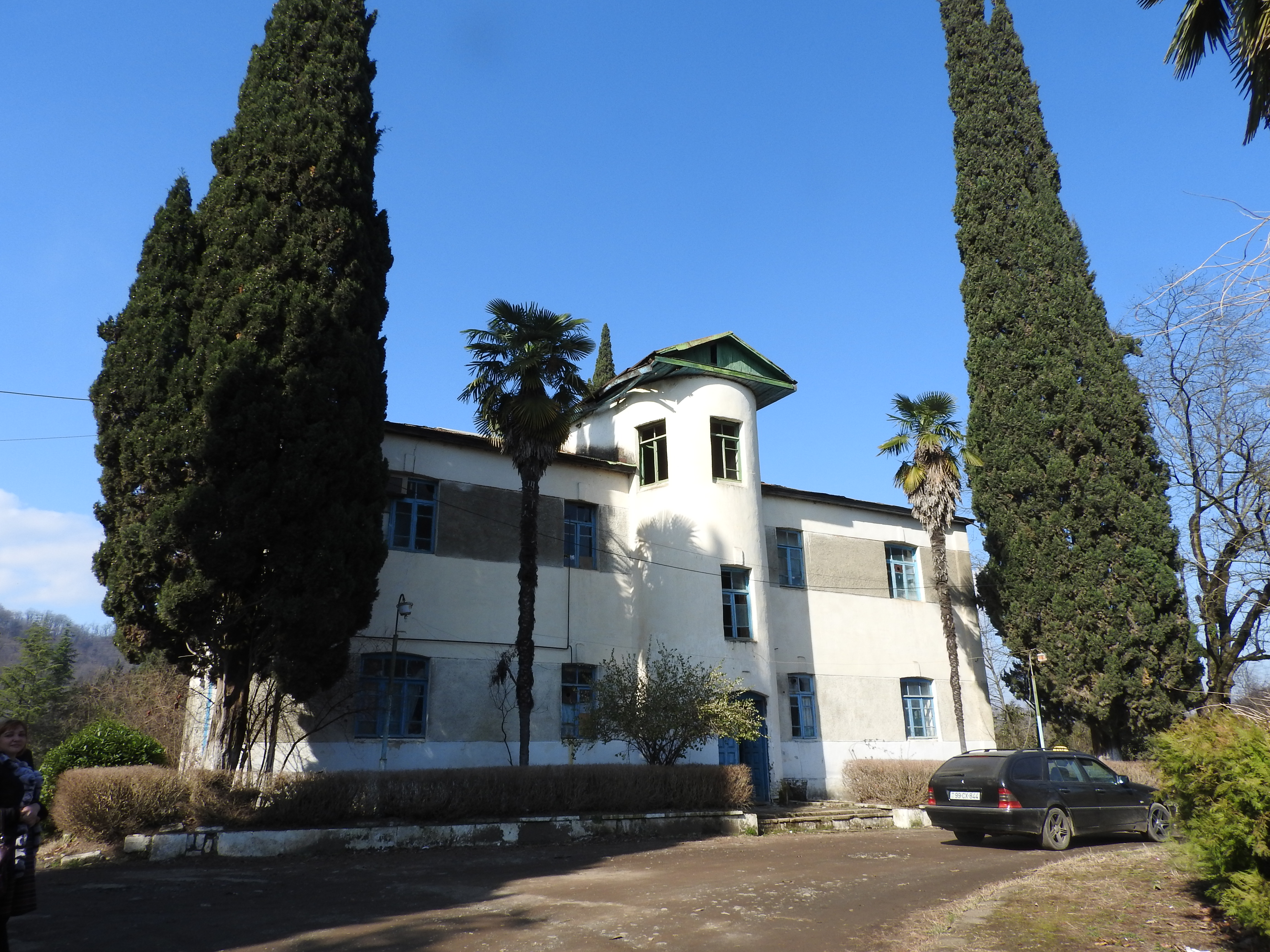
Forest Station

Hotel Gala

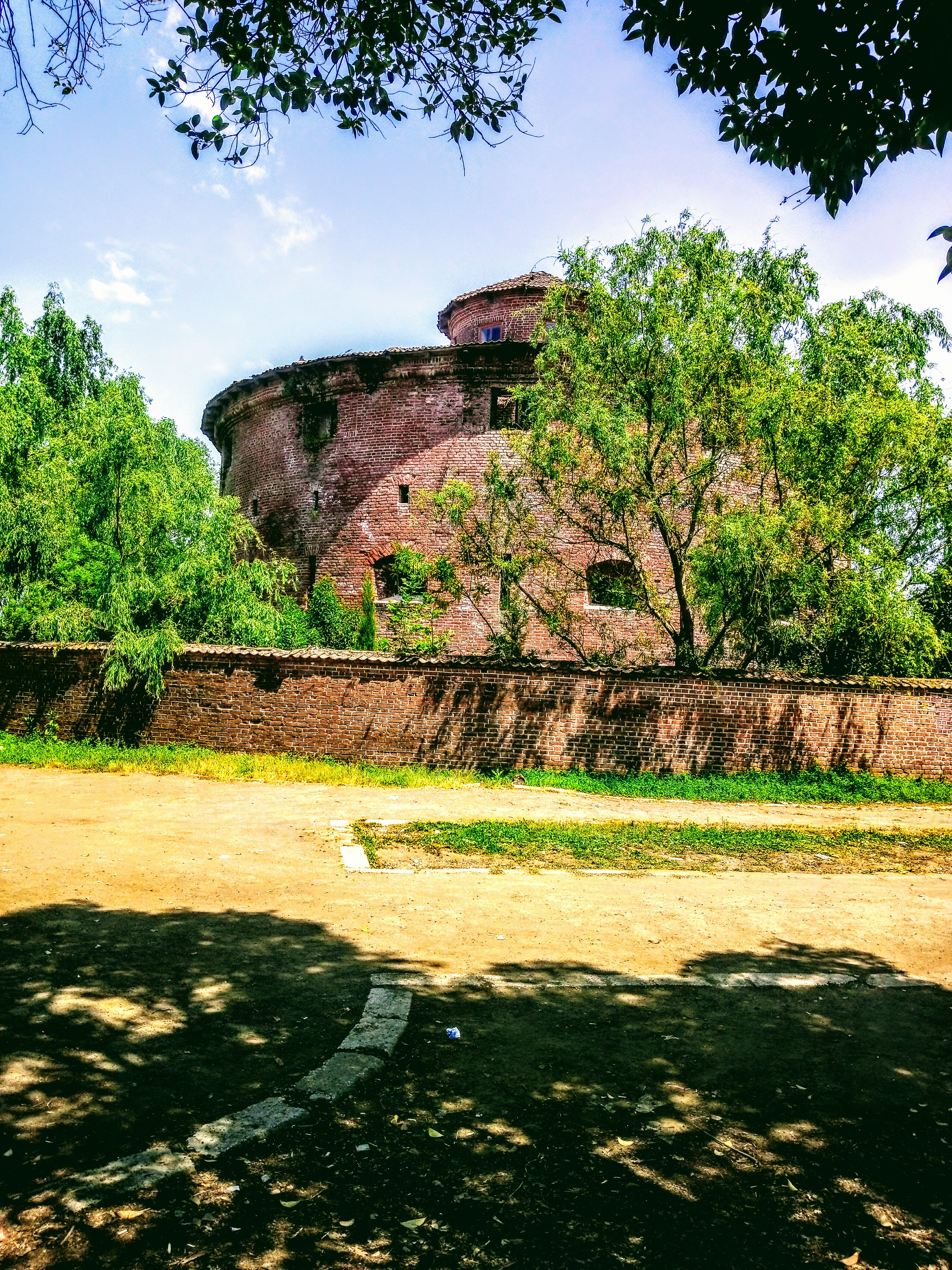
Zindan Fortress

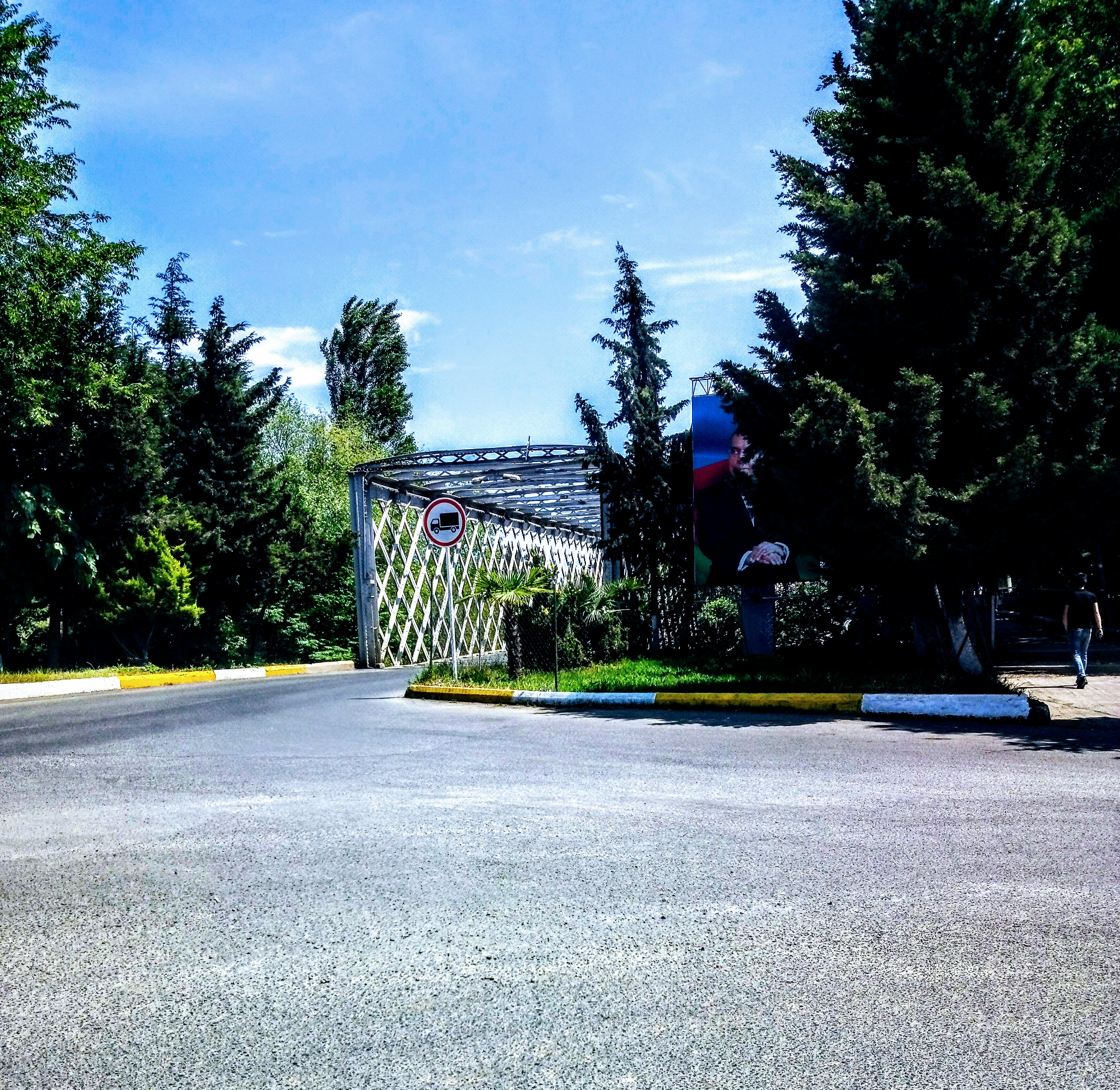
Sutamurdov bridge

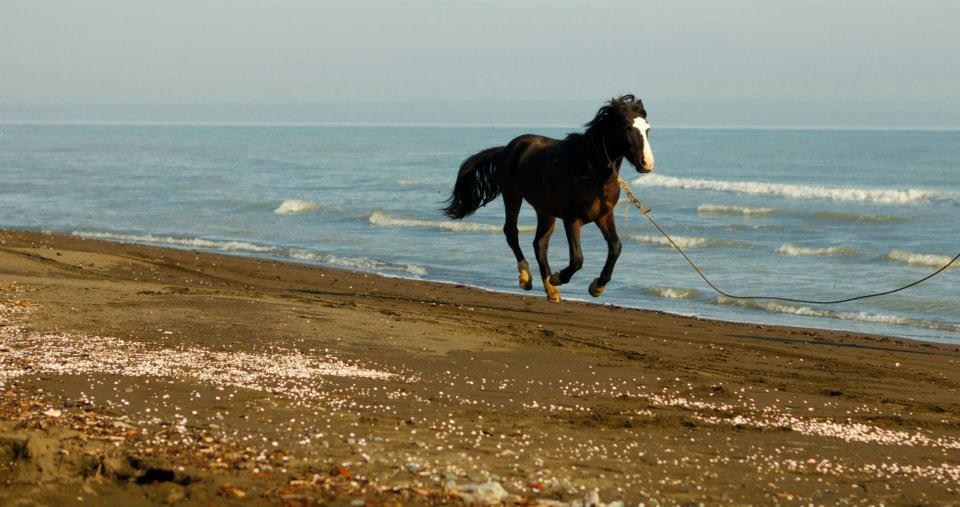
Lankaran, Caspian Sea Coast.

== See also ==
- Lankaran Lowland

== Sources ==
- Akopyan, Alexander; Mosanef, Farbod (2013). "Coins of Langarkunān (Lankarān)". Journal of the Oriental Numismatic Society: 9–11.
- Asatrian, Garnik; Borjian, Habib (2005). "Talish and the Talishis (The State of Research)". Iran and the Caucasus. 9 (1). Brill: 43–72. doi:10.1163/1573384054068169.
- Minorsky, V. & Elwell-Sutton, L.P. (1986). "Lankoran". In Bosworth, C. E.; van Donzel, E.; Lewis, B. & Pellat, Ch. (eds.). The Encyclopaedia of Islam, Second Edition. Volume V: Khe–Mahi. Leiden: E. J. Brill. pp. 656–666. ISBN 978-90-04-07819-2.
- Shahvar, Soli [in Persian]; Abramoff, Emil (2018). "The Khan, the Shah and the Tsar: The Khanate of Talesh between Iran and Russia". In Matthee, Rudi; Andreeva, Elena (eds.). Russians in Iran: Diplomacy and Power in the Qajar Era and Beyond. London: I.B. Tauris. pp. 24–48. ISBN 978-1-78673-336-8.
