= Talysh mythology =

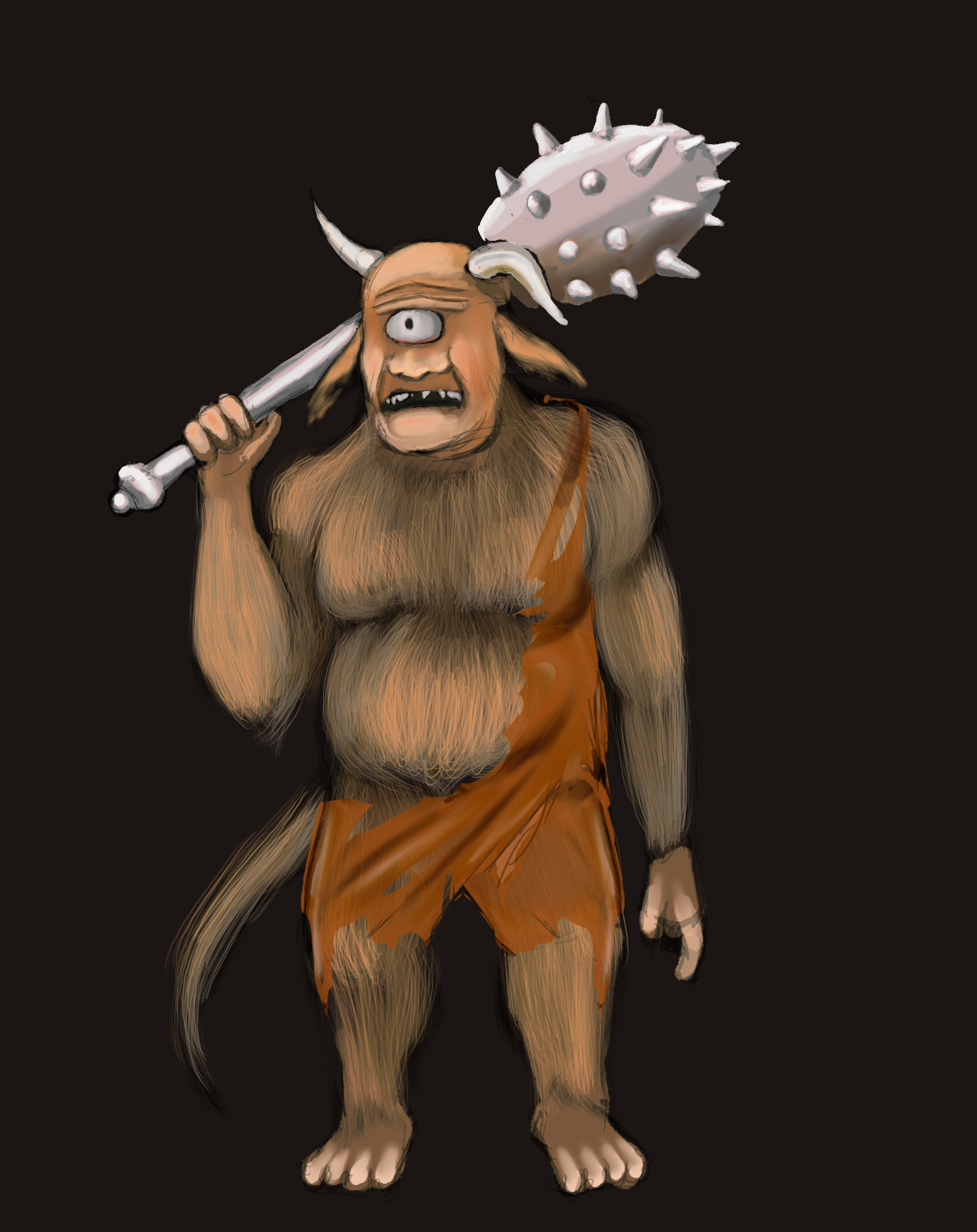
Div — a mythological character from a Talysh folktale

Talysh mythology (Talysh: Толышә мифологијә, romanized: Tolışə mifoloqiyə) are complex mythological representations of the Talysh people. The Talysh mythological worldview carries a synthesis of the natural cult, the Zoroastrian religion reflected in the Avesta and the elements that came with Islam.

== Studying ==
One of the earliest representations of the Talysh folklore is the work of the teacher Teimurbek Bayramalibekov in the "Collection of the Materials for Description of Places and Tribes of the Caucasus" in 1894–1899. In three articles Bayramalibekov described Talysh tales, legends and beliefs.

In 1894, major general of Talysh origin Asad-bey Talyshkhanov living in Tbilisi helped the linguist and ethnographer Lev Lopatinsky in checking the Talysh texts he had collected in the Talysh language. Two texts in the Talysh language these are Talysh fairy tales - "Magic Apple" and "Coward" with a translation into Russian were published in the "Collection of the Materials for Description of Places and Tribes of the Caucasus".

In 1930, the Iranianist scholar Boris Miller published Talysh anecdotes, short stories, songs, fairy tales, proverbs and a small Talysh-Russian-French dictionary in his work "Talysh Texts".

During the period of the Great Purge of 1936-1938 the Talysh aristocracy - Zolfaghar Ahmadzadeh, Mirsalaev Boyukaga, Nasirli Muzaffar and Akhundov Shirali was repressed, Talysh schools, newspapers were closed, the very name of the people disappeared. During this period and until 1989 the Talysh people were ordered to be called Azerbaijanis, respectively this also affected folklore which was presented as Azerbaijani.

After the collapse of the Soviet Union Talysh cultural activity intensified, Talysh fairy tales, mythological images and legends were published in books and opened Talysh newspapers, for example in the newspaper "Tolyshi Sado".

Founded in 2010, the Talysh National Academy is engaged in the systematic study of Talysh folklore, mythology and shows the studied areas in the issues of the academy editions. One of the most complete collections of Talysh fairy tales “Tolışə xəlqi folklor. Nəğılon iyən əfsonon” (“Talysh folklore. Fairy tales and legends”) reflected the elements of Talysh mythology in the collected fairy tales.

== Cosmogonic conceptions of the Talysh ==
The ancestors of the Talysh like other peoples at an early stage of the formation of ethnic consciousness in such natural phenomen as, for example an eclipse of the Sun or Moon saw the approaching destruction of the world. During the Lunar eclipse they knocked on copper dishes and fired from guns wanting to free her by intimidation and noise from the hands of those devils who allegedly detained the luminary. These devils were believed to trap the moon and plunge it into a large and deep lake located in the "third heaven". Only a loud noise or shots from people could make them let the moon go free.

As a relic of astral cults and ideas about the sun in the female hypostasis and the moon in the male are characterized. It is believed that these luminaries were created by Allah as beautiful, like an angels.

In Talysh myths a lightning and thunderstorms are also associated with an old woman living in the sky and at enmity with people; when she is angry, she mounts a horse and gallops across the sky. Whenever a horse's foot hits the firmament it strikes a spark, which we call lightning and thunder - the sound of hooves. Earlier according to legend, the Talysh believed that the earth stands on the horns of a bull and the bull stands on a fish. When the fish turns its head an earthquake occurs, but if the fish suddenly moves then the earth will finally collapse.

== The sacred groves and trees ==
A beech, oak, as well as platanus were considered sacred trees among the Talysh. Early researchers also noted specific specimens that were objects of reverence - the sacred oak in Mashkhan and on the top of Vakhmaku near the villages of Razi and Piada the beech at the height of Ulya Chaves, the sacred grove of platanus trees near the village of Veravul. The places with sacred trees like any shrine are called odjah (hearth) by the Talysh.

At the foot of such trees they lit candles and left money believing that their most secret desires would come true. Trees were decorated with various fabrics and hung with scarves and rags. It was impossible to cut the branches of such trees. The violator of this taboo could pay for it with his life.

Over time, the Talysh began to bury people near the tree and cemeteries began to form. Coming to this place the Talyshes not only remember their dead loved ones, but also worship the trees and stones that bring holiness.

== Deities and spirits ==
- Azhdaho (Әждәһо) - a dragon or serpent, a negative hero, later the image of a giant.
- Alazhen (Алажен) - a demoness or a wild woman trying to harm women in childbirth.
- Alamerd (Аламерд) - a male forest creature, like a snowman, wild and dangerous to humans and a spirit like him called Viavangoli/Biaban-guli (Виәвәнғоли, Ғол) or Ghoul.
- Gara (Ғәрә) - an evil night creature.
- Jinn (Ҹын) - a demon that harms a person.
- Div (Див) - a fearsome, demonic creature often described as stupid and clumsy.
- Duduk (Дудук) - a deity, the patron of rain who brings grace.
- Ledu and Mahmud (Леду ијән Мәһмуд) - according to legend they are brothers who saving their sister; carry the symbol of the savior from enemies they are the image of the messiah for the Talysh.
- Siyakh Galesh (Сијаһ Галеш, Сијо Голыш) - the main owner and guardian of livestock.
- Siyo Chiho (Сијо Чыхо) - the image of a shepherd in a black robe able to bring good luck and fulfill wishes.
- Peri (Пәри) - a fairy with magical abilities.
- Hohan (Хохән, Хохо) - a swamp monster.
- Khydyr Nabi (Хыдыр Нәби, Хызыр) or Kyrdi zoa (Кырди зоә) - the personification of water space and greenery and the patron of livestock.
- Choshamba Khatun (Чошәмбә Хатун) - a creature living in the sea.
- Shasha (Шәшә) — a demoness the size of a cat trying to harm a child.
