= Deportation of the Talysh people =

The Soviet leader Joseph Stalin ordered the deportation the Talysh population from areas bordering Iran, with the aim of ethnic cleansing and internal changes in the ethnic composition of certain areas. It was carried out in Central Asia and in the Kura-Araks zone of the Azerbaijan SSR.

== Background ==
In 1936, a new Constitution of the USSR was adopted and the Transcaucasian Socialist Federative Soviet Republic was liquidated, and the attitude towards peoples changed; a period of introducing a policy of assimilation of many national minorities in favor of the titular people and the prohibition of their ethnonym began.

After the plenum of the Central Committee, held on June 6, 1937, on the eve of the 13th Congress of the Communist Party of Azerbaijan, where the content of the upcoming report of the Central Committee to the Congress was discussed, the issue of cleansing the Azerbaijani language from Persian, Arabic and Ottoman layers was raised, among others. One of the participants in the discussion spoke about the need to "cleanse the Tat language". To which Mirjafar Bagirov said: "I think it is time to move from the Tat, Kurdish, Talysh languages to the Azerbaijani language. The People's Commissariat of Education should take the initiative, they are all Azerbaijanis."

After this plenum, a decision was made to abandon teaching in other languages and switch to the Azerbaijani language, schools in the Talysh language were closed, periodicals were discontinued, and Talysh scientists and public figures (Ahmedzade Z., Nasirli M., Mirsalaev B. and others), were subjected to repression.

== Deportation of 1938 ==
Talyshes also experienced waves of involuntary resettlement as state authorities sought to clear borderland areas of supposedly undesirable or untrustworthy persons. In the latter half of the 1930s, some Talyshes living along the border were deported from the republic or forcibly moved into cities. Later, in the early 1950s, thousands of people in this area, mostly Talyshes, were involuntarily resettled to the Kura-Araks region of the AzSSR.

The repressions against the Talysh affected not only the intelligentsia, but also the general population. In a telegram from January 1938, the People's Commissar of Internal Affairs of the USSR N. Yezhov sent a request to the Deputy People's Commissar of Internal Affairs of the Azerbaijan SSR T. Borshchev to immediately cleanse the Iranian districts of Baku and Kirovabad. It was necessary to detain Iranians who did not have a Soviet or Iranian passport, primarily those involved in anti-Soviet activities, conduct large-scale interrogations to identify accomplices, and after a court decision, deport them with their families either to Iran or to specially designated places within the USSR.

In his 1931 memorandum on work among the national minorities of Azerbaijan, Alimadatov paid attention to border issues and Iranian influence in the Talysh regions. Their way of life is closer to the way of life in Iran than in the rest of Azerbaijan, and that the Soviet Talysh maintain close kinship ties with the Talysh in Iran. Alimadatov concludes that sensitivity to the characteristics of border regions inhabited by culturally backward "little ones" requires immediate attention to the cultural and necessary development of the Talysh people.

As a result, a number of ethnic Talysh from the Astara, Lankaran, Lerik, and Yardimli regions were deported to the deserts of Kazakhstan and Azerbaijan, despite the fact that their ethnicity was not mentioned in official documents. As Christa Goff says, the Talysh were deported at this time either because they were included in the Iranian environment, i.e. called "Iranian", or because they lived along the Iranian border in Soviet Azerbaijan. Peter Kokaisl reports that the exact numbers of deported Talysh remain elusive, as publicly available documents and records refer to "Iranians" or "Kurds", which is essentially a misidentification.

Some officials decided that the best way to counter concerns about unstable borders and suspicious residents was to physically remove people characterized as unreliable from these areas. Some Talysh were deported to Central Asia, while others were forced to abandon their villages and move to cities such as Astara and Lenkoran, where they could presumably be better monitored.

After relying on the document of January 1938, in a letter sent to the Chairman of the Council of People's Commissars V. Molotov, with the signatures of the People's Commissar of Internal Affairs N. Yezhov and the head of the USSR State Security Department L. Beria, dated September 24, 1938, it is stated:

By the decision of the Politburo of January 19, 1938 (Protocol No. 56/308) the NKVD of the USSR was proposed to resettle all Iranians living in the border regions of Azerbaijan and who had obtained Soviet citizenship to Kazakhstan within a month. This decision was not implemented in a timely manner.

Currently, 2,000 families (6,000 people) of Iranians who had obtained Soviet citizenship have been registered and prepared for resettlement to Kazakhstan. Their resettlement was scheduled to begin on October 15, 1938. We present a draft resolution of the Council of People's Commissars of the USSR on the procedure for resettlement and economic arrangements for Iranians.

On October 8, 1938, the Council of People's Commissars of the USSR adopted Resolution No. 1084-269-ss "On the resettlement of Iranians from the border regions of the Azerbaijan SSR to the Kazakh SSR", defining the legal, financial, technical and economic aspects of this deportation. Only 3.4 million rubles were allocated for the implementation of these measures. The Council of People's Commissars of the Kazakh SSR was tasked with the construction of 1,000 two-apartment houses to accommodate migrants during 1938-1939. At the same time, migrants were required to use their own resources both in construction and in the preparation of building materials.

On November 6, 1938, the Council of People's Commissars and the Central Committee of the Communist Party (Bolsheviks) of Kazakhstan detailed the measures to be taken against the settlers, and the places of residence of the deportees in the Alma-Ata and South Kazakhstan regions were determined. The resolution instructed the leadership of the regions and districts to ensure the delivery of the families of the Iranian settlers to the designated places within 12 hours of their arrival in Kazakhstan. Repair work in specially prepared houses for them was to be completed within four days. Each family was to be given 1,600 rubles so that they could quickly put their home conditions in order. Within five days, work was to be organized to provide the Iranians with flour products and feed for their livestock. The Ministry of Education was instructed to conduct an accurate registration of the children of the settlers of school age and create conditions for their education in local schools. If there were teachers among the settlers, they were to be immediately hired regardless of their knowledge of Kazakh or Russian and given retraining courses with full retention of wages. The Talysh were resettled in 12 regions of Kazakhstan.

== Deportations of 1939-1953 ==
From 1939 to 1953, in order to ensure the security of the 800-meter zone near the border with Iran, deportations of Talysh were carried out in the Yardimli region of the Azerbaijan SSR. Residents of the villages of Tezekend, Sibroni, Alili and Abily were deported to the Pushkin region (now Bilasuvar) of the Azerbaijan SSR. One of the forced migrants recalls:

It would be better never to live to see the day of Stalin decided your fate. I remember one day when they came to take us away from our village. It was like a bad dream. They moved us all to the Bilasuvar district, which was Pushkin district at the time. It was like being uprooted, like your heart was being torn apart. We felt lost in our new surroundings. What we had thought of as home was now a distant memory.

After Mir Jafar Bagirov’s trip to the Vargheduz region (from July 19, 1938 the region became Yardimli) in the summer of 1937, the Central Committee of the Communist Party of Azerbaijan on August 1, 1937 adopted Resolution No. 14/2 on the resettlement of residents of all residential areas located within 500 meters from the Iranian border.

== See also ==
- Forced assimilation of Talysh people in Azerbaijan
