= Igbal Abilov =

Abilov Igbal (December 12, 1989, village of Kolatan, Masally district, Azerbaijan SSR) is a scientific researcher, Talysh scholar, educator, editor-in-chief of the "Herald of the Talysh National Academy" and a research fellow at the Talysh National Academy.

== Biography ==
Igbal Shahini Abilov was born in Kulaton village, Masally district, Azerbaijan SSR in 1989. At the age of 8, the family moved to Belarus, where Igbal went to second grade. In 2007, he graduated from school, and in 2012 he graduated from the Faculty of International Relations of the Belarusian State University. Later, continuing his education, he completed his master's degree in 2013 and his postgraduate degree in 2016 from the same faculty.

He is the author of books, publications and essays, as well as a participant in scientific conferences in the field of history and ethnography of the South Caucasus, Turkey and Iran.

In 2017-2021 he was Lecturer at the Faculty of International Relations of the Belarusian State University.

In 2021-2023 he taught at the Belarusian Institute of Law.

== Talysh National Academy ==
In 2010, the Talysh National Academy (TNA) was registered in Riga (Latvia), which since 2017 has continued its activities in Vilnius (Lithuania) under the name "Talyšų Nacionalinė Akademija".

He is the editor-in-chief of the "Herald of the Talysh National Academy", which is an international scientific journal dedicated to the scientific study of Talysh.

Scientists and researchers from Russia, Azerbaijan, France, Iran, the Netherlands, Northern Cyprus and Armenia published their works on the pages of the "Herald" on the topics of Talysh history, ethnography, culture and language.

In 2011, TNA published a book with historical and ethnographic essays by I. Abilov and I. Mirzalizade.

From July 4-8, 2011, the IX Congress of Ethnographers and Anthropologists of Russia was held in Petrozavodsk. On July 6, the report of the staff member of the Talysh National Academy Igbal Abilov "Folklore as a source for reconstructing the historical memory of the Talysh people" was heard at the congress. The work focused on two mythical creatures known in the oral folklore of the Talysh people: "Siyo Chykho", common in Azerbaijani Talysh, and "Siyah Galesh", common, respectively, in Iranian Talysh. The audience was particularly interested in the situation of the Talysh people, the problems facing the preservation of the language and cultural heritage. The listeners were interested in the difference in the situation of the Talysh people in the Soviet period and at the present stage.

From April 25 to May 5, 2012, the Talysh National Academy, together with the Peter the Great Museum of Anthropology and Ethnography of the Russian Academy of Sciences (the Kunstkamera) and the Russian Ethnographic Museum, conducted a scientific expedition to Southern (Iranian) Talysh. The expedition was led by TNA staff member Igbal Abilov. The TNA representative in Southern (Iranian) Talysh Armin Faridi is a researcher of the Talysh musical tradition, a collector of folklore, and the author of the collection “Talysh Music”, which presents 100 folk songs from all over Talysh. The expedition was the first attempt to survey Iranian Talysh in Russian-language ethnographic science; the trip was primarily aimed at familiarizing with the region, its cultural, geographical, and social features. Several interviews were collected with residents of Talysh villages in the area of the Rasht city; there were visited the Talysh city of Masule and the Gilan Rural Heritage Museum, which presents 20 different examples of local architecture, as well as the rural area of Alyand in Fuman, the Rasht Bazaar, as well as the city museum, where, in addition to the life of the local population, artifacts found during archaeological excavations in Marlik, Tul-e Talysh, Amlash, Agh Evlar are also presented. During the expedition, extensive material was collected on the identity of the Talysh people, their relationships with surrounding peoples, economy (rice growing, cattle breeding), calendar cycle, pantheon. Based on the collected field materials, there were made reports, which were presented at the Lavrov (Central Asian-Caucasian) readings of different years.

== Detention and trial ==
Igbal Abilov arrived in Azerbaijan on June 14, 2024, to attend his cousin's wedding and to rest.

On June 22, the State Security officers who arrived in the village took Abilov to the Masalli District State Security Service Department, where he was interrogated for 6 hours.

On June 27, when he tried to fly from Baku to Bucharest (on the way to Belarus), he was not allowed to board the plane, his passport and 2 phones were taken away. On July 22, Abilov was again summoned to the Masalli District State Security Service Department under the pretext of returning his passport and phones. However, without notifying his relatives, Abilov was taken to Baku.

After contacting the ombudsman, the parents were informed that Abilov was suspected under Articles 274 ("high treason"), 281.3 ("public calls against the state, committed on the instructions of foreign organizations or their representatives") and 283.1 ("incitement to national, racial, social or religious hatred and enmity") of the Criminal Code of Azerbaijan. The prosecution did not provide any public evidence to support these charges.

According to Abilov's relatives, he was detained on trumped-up charges, and the real reason for his persecution is his study of various national minorities, including the Talysh people of Azerbaijan. Igbal's father said that his son had lived in Belarus since childhood: "My son was not involved in politics. He conducted extensive scientific research. His research concerns not only Talysh, but also the entire vast region from China to Turkey."

On July 24, 2024, in Baku, by a court decision (decision number 4 (009) -388/2024) Igbal was placed under four-month arrest for the duration of the investigation without the opportunity to see his relatives.

On May 20, 2025, Abilov was sentenced to 18 years in prison on charges of high treason, widely reported as politically motivated. He denied all charges during almost a year of pre-trial detention and the subsequent trial.

=== Reactions to the arrest and sentencing ===
- International Association for Media and Communication Research (IAMCR) issued a statement condemning the imprisonment of both Igbal Abilov and Bahruz Samadov "in retaliation for their academic work and activism.” Other human rights and academic organisations also issued statements condemning the arrest and calling for his release.
- Amnesty International issued a call to action describing his arrest and sentencing under “false charges" and "apparently part of a campaign to suppress criticism”, calling for his release.
- The PACE General Rapporteur condemned the 18-year prison sentence, arguing it violates academic freedom and calling for his release.
- A joint statement was issued by European Parliament instances condemning the "harsh prison sentences" in "politically motivated cases".
- United Nations experts called for his release, expressing deep concerns that "the arrests and trial of Abilov and Samadov have equated academic research, advocacy for peace and the promotion of a minority’s cultural identity with high treason,”

== Bibliography ==
- Abilov I., Mirzalizadeh I. “The Talyshs”. Short historical studies. — Minsk: «Medisont», 2011. — P. 155—178. — 224 p. — ISBN 978-985-6982-07-4
- Folklore as a source of historical reconstruction of the Talysh nation // IX Congress of ethnographers and anthropologists of Russia: Abstracts of reports. — 2011. — P. 63.
- Some magical practices in Talysh culture // Lavrov’s collection: Materials of XXXVI and XXXVII Central Asian and Caucasian lectures in 2012-2013. — 2013. — P. 191—199.
- The Kurdish factor in modern external policy of Turkiye // Actual problems of international relations and global development: collection of scientific articles, 2nd release/ drawn by. Е. А. Dostanko; editorial team: А. M. Baychorov (chief editor) [and others]. – Minks: BSU, 2014. – Pp. 177-180.
- Ethno-confessional factor in the policy of Turkiye and Russia’s interests in the Middle East // Russia and Turkiye in the new world political environment / Chief Editor: А.А. Orlov, Executive Editor: V.А. Avatkov, S.B. Druzhilovskiy, А.V. Fedorchenko// Materials of the Third international conference of experts-turkologists (MGIMO Moscow, March 27, 2015). ‒ М.: IMI MGIMO MIA of Russia, 2015. ‒ Pp. 22-28.
- Abilov I. Sh., Goulyayeva E. U., Zakharova E. U. “Population of the borderlands of Georgia, Armenia and Turkiye: edges of identity (notes on results of expedition in 2014) // Caucasus: crossroads of cultures. — St.Petersburg: MAE RAS, 2015. — Pp. 235-254.
- Abilov I. Sh., Baranov D. A., Goulyayeva E. U., Zakharova E. U. “Passage of periods: Batumi– Kars: photo album. / Project “Different earth”, Т. V., St.Petersburg: Slaviya, 2015. – 280 p.
- Abilov I. Sh., Sarigyez O.V. “Gestures as nonverbal lacunae and stable expressions accompanying them” (based on materials in Turkish language), Herald of Adygea State University, 2 (2012), 2018. – Pp. 80-86.
- Abilov I., “In memory of Kahin Abilov” https://regnum.ru/article/2980579, June 13, 2020.
- Abilov I., “Repressed Talysh studies”, https://regnum.ru/article/2504611, October 21, 2018.
- Implementing the Belt and Road Initiative: China in the South Caucasus. In: BRIresearch blog: Materials of the International Conference “The Belt and Road Initiative and a New Era of Transcultural Networks”, Uppsala University, May 2019
- “Turkish folklore songs” 1903 / B. V. Miller; Translation from Russian, introduction text and commentaries: İgbal Abilov, Elnur Ağayev. — 1st edition. — Ankara: Atatürk Cultural Centre, 2022

== See also ==
- Talysh assimilation
- Talysh studies
