= Kolatan =

Kolatan may refer to:

- Kolatan, Astara, Azerbaijan
- Kolatan, Masally, Azerbaijan
