= Bahruz Samadov =

Azerbaijani scholar, political scientist, political prisoner

- Bəhruz Valeh oğlu Səmədov
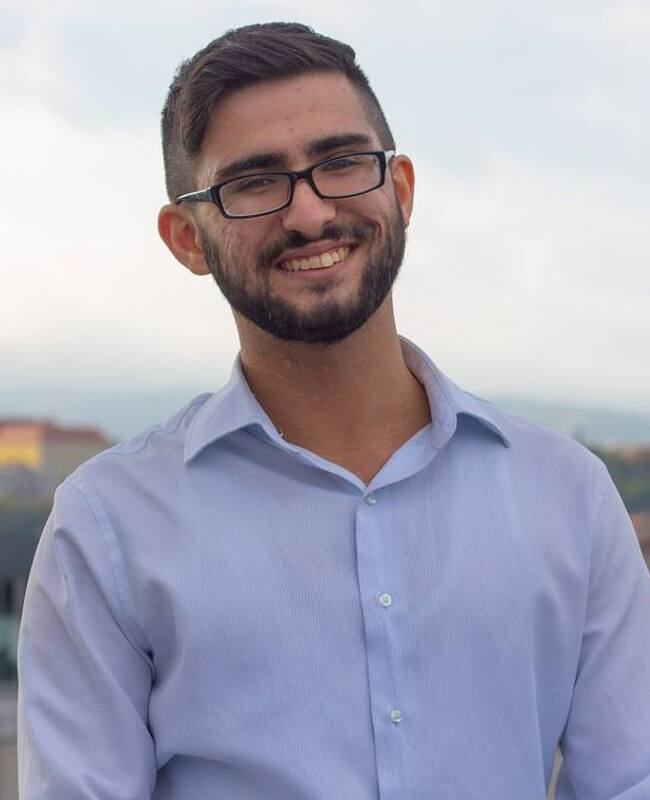
- Bahruz Samadov, a few days before his arrest
- Born: Bahruz Valeh oghlu Samadov; 29 April 1995 (age 31); Baku, Azerbaijan
- Education: Baku branch of Moscow State University (B • M); Central European University (M); Charles University (PhD)
- Occupations: Political scientist, researcher
- Years active: 2013–
- Organization: NIDA Civic Movement (2013–2020)
- Known for: Peace activism and political imprisonment
- Political party: Azerbaijani Popular Front Party (2013)
- Criminal charges: High treason
- Criminal status: Court proceedings ongoing

Bahruz Samadov (Azerbaijani: Bəhruz Səmədov; 29 April 1995) is an Azerbaijani political scientist, researcher, peace activist and political prisoner. He was a regular author at OC Media. He is known for his critical writings about the Azerbaijani government and his peaceful position in the Nagorno-Karabakh conflict.

He was detained by Azerbaijani authorities in August 2024 and arrested under Article 274 (treason) of the Criminal Code. His arrest was strongly criticized by a number of local and international institutions. He is currently being held in the detention center of the Azerbaijani State Security Service (SSS). In June 2025, he was sentenced to 15 years in prison.

== Early life ==
Bahruz Valeh oghlu Samadov was born on 29 April 1995 in Baku, Azerbaijan. In 2001–2012, he studied at secondary school number 251 in Nizami District. In 2012, he was admitted to the Faculty of Philology of the Baku branch of Moscow State University named after M.V. Lomonosov and graduated with honors in 2016. In 2016–2018, he received a master's degree in philology at the same university, and in 2018–2019, he received a master's degree in international relations at the Central European University in Hungary. Since 2019, he is a doctoral student of the political science department of the Prague Institute of Political Studies of Charles University, Czech Republic.

In 2021–2022, he was an intern at the Institute of International Relations in Prague, and in 2023 he was a fellow at Friedrich Schiller University in Jena.

== Activism ==
Bahruz Samadov became a member of the Azerbaijani Popular Front Party in 2013, and during the presidential elections of that year, he actively participated in the campaign of the candidate of the National Council, Jamil Hasanli. In 2013–2020, he was a member of the NİDA Civic Movement, and in 2017–2018, he was represented in the Board of Directors of NİDA. On 1 November 2015, on the ballot paper used during the parliamentary elections, he wrote the names of political prisoners and "Freedom for political prisoners!". A day later, he was summoned to the Baku City General Police Department for writing the slogan. In the office, the police pressured Samadov to apologize for writing a slogan in the bulletin. He was released after being detained for almost 3 hours.

Samadov has repeatedly participated in opposition rallies and civil society's protests. On 9 September 2020, he was detained by the police during the protests demanding for release of the political prisoner Tofig Yagublu.

== Research ==
Bahruz Samadov has been known as a researcher since 2016. In his articles, Samadov criticized the power of President of Azerbaijan Ilham Aliyev, which lasted for more than 20 years, and called his rule authoritarian. His articles or translations are published in OC Media, Eurasianet, openDemocracy independent news platforms, Institute for War and Peace Reporting (IWPR), Baku Research Institute and Institute for International Political Studies, as well as International Journal of Politics, New Eastern Europe and Caucasus Edition journals. Samadov regularly appeared as a political commentator on Radio Liberty, BBC News, Nastoyashcheye vremya and TV Rain in Russia, and ČT24 in the Czech Republic.

In 2020, Bahruz Samadov spoke out against the military operations that took place during the Second Nagorno-Karabakh war, post-war period, Armenia–Azerbaijan border crisis and 2023 Azerbaijani offensive in Nagorno-Karabakh. Samadov stated that he saw the solution of the Nagorno-Karabakh conflict in peace, and criticized the war crimes that took place during the military operations. Samadov's articles on war and peace were repeatedly "targeted" by the pro-government media, and Samadov was insulted by being called a "traitor" and "pro-Armenian".

In April 2021, in the article titled "Azerbaijani authoritarianism and Baku's Military Trophy Park" published on the Eurasianet independent news platform, Samadov called the display of helmets of dead Armenian soldiers in the Military Trophy Park as dehumanizing, criticizing the presentation of Armenians as enemies by the Azerbaijani authorities for decades. Also, he was framed by the pro-government news sites as a "traitor" and "pro-Armenian" because he wrote that "Armenians receive a close attitude to fascism in Azerbaijan" in his 2023 article titled "Azerbaijan needs an alternative to nationalistic militarism" published in OC Media.

In an interview with OC Media in April 2023, Samadov called what happened in the Lachin corridor "a siege" and stated that the main goal of this was to clear Nagorno-Karabakh of Armenians. Bahruz Samadov is a researcher on hegemony and political discourses in Azerbaijan, as well as issues of identity, political stability and populism based on post-structuralist and psychoanalytical theories.

== Imprisonment ==
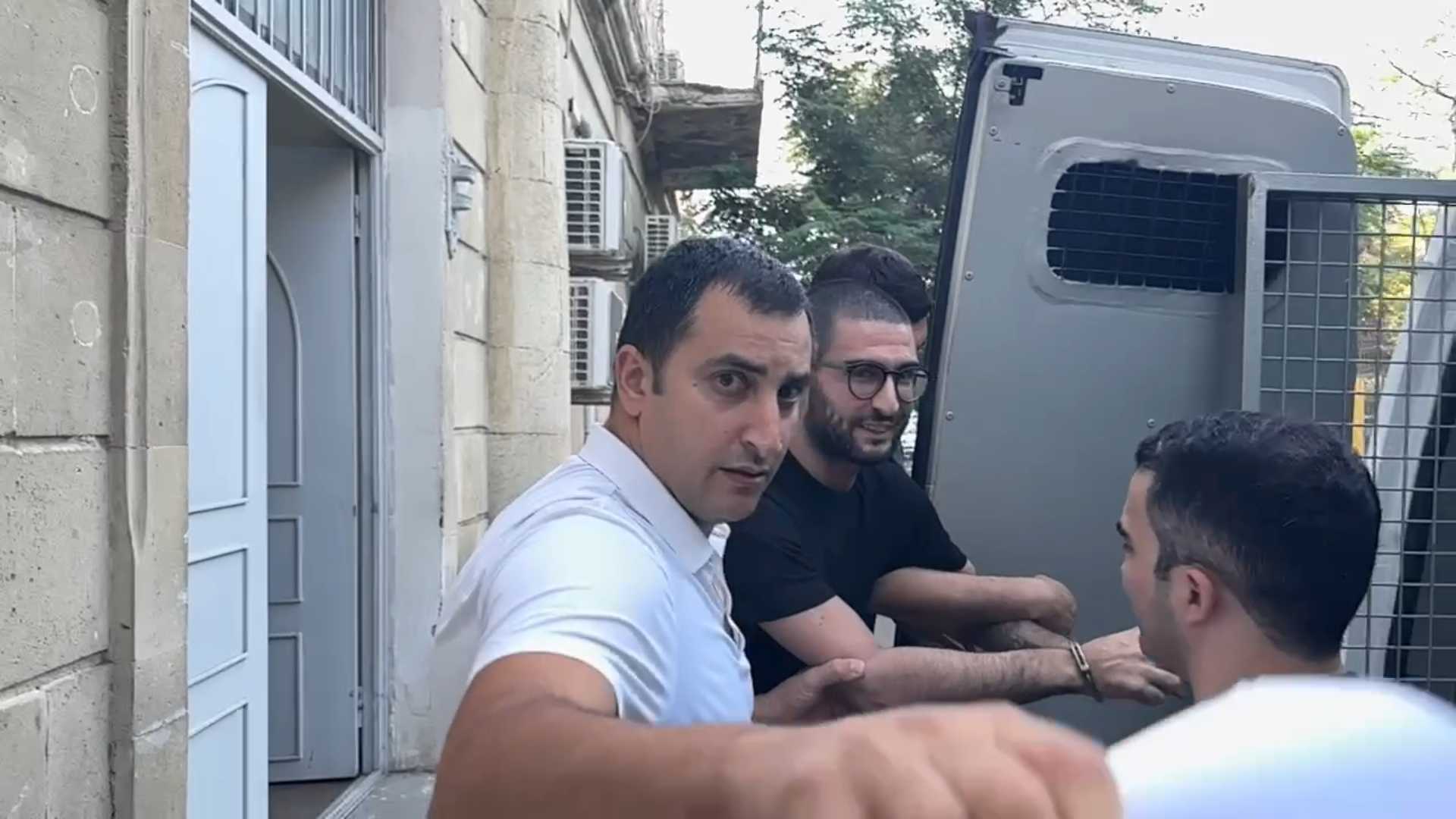
Samadov being brought to Sabail District Court

Samadov was arrested in August 2024. On 21 August, his friends reported in the social network that they could not hear anything from Bahruz Samadov for more than six hours. His friend, Aykhan Zayedzadeh, said that at around 16:25 (UTC+04:00), Samadov sent him a message on Telegram that he would be arrested. After this message, nothing could be heard from him. According to his grandmother, Zibeyda Osmanova, on 21 August, around 16:00, Samadov left the house to meet a friend of his. About half an hour later, 5–6 people came to their house, introduced themselves as employees of the State Security Service (SSS) and said that there was a complaint about Samadov's illegal drug dealing. During the search, they took Samadov's computer, documents, diplomas, and a book with Samadov's article written in English. Later, a public defender named Vafa called Osmanova and said that Samadov was suspected of "high treason" because of his correspondence with Armenians and his articles written "with the order of Armenians". Neither his family nor the lawyer Zibeyda Sadigova, hired by his family to protect his rights, were informed about Bahruz Samadov for 2 days. On 23 August, Samadov was charged with Article 274 (treason) of the Criminal Code, and by the decision of the Sabail District Court, a preventive measure of 4 months was chosen. Samadov denied the allegations against him and claimed that he was being subjected to psychological and physical abuse by the SSS. Samadov was remanded to detention while awaiting sentencing.

Samadov’s arrest was severely criticized by a number of local and international institutions. The Ministry of Foreign Affairs of the Czech Republic stated that it was concerned about his arrest and was closely monitoring the situation. European Union Foreign Affairs Spokesperson Peter Stano expressed concern about Samadov’s detention and called on Azerbaijan to stop targeting dissidents with unjust arrests.

Freedom House called on the Azerbaijani government to end the criminal prosecution of Samadov, and to release him and other dissidents from prison.

The administration of Charles University, where Samadov studied, expressed concern about his arrest and stated that it was monitoring the proceedings.

Azerbaijani historian Altay Goyushov stated that Samadov's arrest was part of a wider wave of repression aimed at "supporters of peace and good-neighborly relations during the conflict" between Azerbaijan and Armenia.

On 23 June 2025, Samadov was sentenced to 15 years in prison.

=== Reactions to the arrest and sentencing ===
- International Association for Media and Communication Research (IAMCR) issued a statement condemning the imprisonment of both Igbal Abilov and Bahruz Samadov "in retaliation for their academic work and activism." Other human rights and academic organisations also issued statements condemning the arrest and sentencing and calling for his release.
- Amnesty International issued a call to action describing his arrest and sentencing under “false charges" and "apparently part of a campaign to suppress criticism”, calling for his release.
- A joint statement was issued by European Parliament instances condemning the "harsh prison sentences" in "politically motivated cases".
- Friedrich Naumann Foundation described Bahruz as a prisoner of conscience.
- Human Rights Watch condemned the imprisonment and sentencing "on bogus high treason charges" in what it described as Azerbaijani authorities' "relentless crackdown on critics".
- United Nations experts called for his release, expressing deep concerns that "the arrests and trial of Abilov and Samadov have equated academic research, advocacy for peace and the promotion of a minority’s cultural identity with high treason,”
- Slavoj Žižek called on Ilham Aliyev to reconsider Samadov's sentence on 26 January 2026.

=== Subsequent events ===
At a court hearing at the Supreme Court of Azerbaijan on 25 September 2026, Samadov used a sharp object to cut his right arm several times. Amnesty International called on Azerbaijani authorities to grant him urgent access to physical and mental healthcare.

== See also ==
- Human rights in Azerbaijan
