= Nasirli Muzaffar =

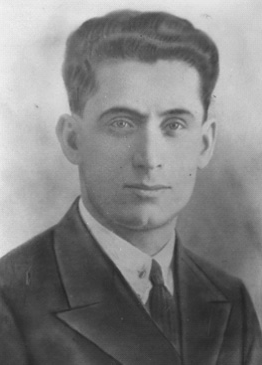
- Born: 1902; Şağlakücə village, Lenkoran uezd, Baku governorate of the Russian Empire
- Died: March 3, 1944 (aged 41–42); Masallı, Masally District, Azerbaijani SSR of the Russian Empire
- Occupation: folklorist, teacher, linguist, journalist, poet
- Language: Talysh
- Citizenship: Russian Empire, Soviet Union
- Education: Azerbaijan State Pedagogical University
- Years active: 1920 — 1944

Nasirli Muzaffar (Talysh, Azerbaijani: Nəsirli Muzəffər, 1902–1944) was a Talysh poet, folklorist, linguist, teacher and journalist, a prominent figure in the Talysh national cultural revival in the 1930s.

== Biography ==
Muzaffar Nasirli Ibrahimzadeh was born in 1902 in the village of Shaglazuza, Lankaran uezd, Baku governorate of the Russian Empire. His father Hadji Ibrahim was a merchant and owned his shop in the village. He received his initial education at a school at a mosque and an elementary school and then continued his studies in Lankaran.

In 1920, the “Society for the study of the Talysh region” was created, and he participated in this society and got acquainted with the researcher of the Talysh language, folklore and Iranianist Boris Miller. This acquaintance later had a positive effect on his activities. Miller with professor Vali Huluflu took part in scientific expeditions in connection with the study of the Talysh language and the search for samples of folklore. Nasirli carried out his main work on the way of collecting Talysh folklore, printing and clarification.

On November 18, 1928, Nasirli appeared on the Azerbaijani radio in Baku and performed 4 Talysh songs. There are also indications that a radio editorial office was organized in Lankaran in 1938, and Muzaffar Nasirli became the first radio editor.

It is known that since the 1920s-1930s, the Moscow Central State Library has kept hundreds of books on culture, science, educational literature, various articles and printed publications in the Talysh language based on Latin script. The authors and editors of many of these works were two people - Muzaffar Nasirli and Zolfaghar Ahmadzadeh.

In 1929, together with Shokhub Mursalov he published the first book in the Talysh language “Səvodin bıbən” (“Be educated”) and in 1930 together with the poet Zolfaghar Ahmadzadeh, he wrote textbooks for Talysh schools. He also translated a geography textbook from Azerbaijani into Talysh.

Since 1930 Nasirli has been actively involved in translation activities. One of the examples of his translation activities is his translation of the work of Leo Tolstoy "Stories about animals" ("Çı həyvonon həxədə hikoyon") into the Talysh language and published in 1935.

In the same 1935 his translations into the Talysh language of the works of Mirza Akhundov “The story of Monsieur Jourdan, a botanist and the dervish Mastalishah, a famous sorcerer” (Talysh: “Çı nəbatati həkim Musyo Jordani de coduəkə dəvişi Məstəli Şahi nəğl”) and a popular story by Valentina Dmitryeva "The Kid and the dog" (tal. "Rukəli iyən Pisə"), which went through more than twenty editions.

After the plenum of the Central Committee, held on June 6, 1937, on the eve of the 13th Congress of the Communist Party of Azerbaijan, where the issue of the content of the forthcoming report of the Central Committee to the congress was discussed among other things the issue of purification of the Azerbaijani language was raised. After this plenum, a decision was made to move away from teaching in other languages and switch to the Azerbaijani language. By 1936–1938, the Talysh aristocracy was subjected to repressions, the Talysh schools were closed and publication of books and newspapers was stopped.

=== Arrest ===
After that, Nasirli was arrested in 1936 as an "enemy of the people" and despite the fact that not enough evidence was found. On August 11, 1937, he was sentenced by the Military Tribunal of the Baku garrison to 7 years in camps with a loss of rights for 3 years. He served his prison sentence in the Correctional labour camp in Tashkent (Uzbekistan). On March 5, 1940, due to the lack of evidence collected the case was dismissed by the Military Collegium of the Supreme Court of the Soviet Union and Nasirli was released. After returning from the place of detention, due to a mental shock, he retired from scientific work.

After his release, he taught in Baku. From 1940 to 1941 he worked as a teacher at the department of state administration of education at orphanages in Mashtagha. From 1941 to 1944 he worked as deputy director for educational work in the comprehensive schools in Masally.

On March 3, 1944, he died of typhus, which was then widespread in the city of Masally and was buried at the Masally cemetery.

== Bibliography ==
- “Talьş Mahnьlarь" (Talysh songs, 1929)
- "Zәrbәjnә qomsomol: bo IV-nә ƣrupijo" (Komsomolets-drummer: for the IV group of rural schools, 1932–1933)
- "Tojə məktəb" (New school, 1932)
- In collaboration with Shahub Mursalov - “İminə Kitob” (First book, 1929)
- In collaboration with Shahub Mursalov - "Səvodin-Bьbən" (Be educated, 1930)

=== In collaboration with Zolfaghar Ahmadzadeh ===
- "Mьƶdi votdə", 1930
- "Zəhmət iyən Məktəb" (Labor and school, 1930)
- "Jimoni ro" (bo besəvodono) (Life path (for the illiterate), 1931)
- "Iştə zınəy ve kən" (Increase knowledge, 1931)
- "Ozodвə soron" (Years of release, 1931)
- "Seynə sor. Bo kolxozə məktəbono" (Third year. For collective farm schools, 1931)
- "Zərbəyn (bo kam əzıno)" (Drummer (for the illiterate) 1932)
- "Tojə jimon" (New life, 1932)
- "Sıə kolxoz" (Red kolkhoz, 1932)
- "Əlifba" (Alphabet, 1933)
- "Handə kitob. Bo II dərsə soriyo" (Reading book for grade 2, 1933)
- "Tolışə zıvon. Bo naştınə məktəbono (qramər iyən nıvıştə ğaydon)" (Talysh language. For elementary grades (grammar and rules), 1934)
- "Handə kitob (bo yolono)" (Reading book (for adults), 1935)

=== Verses in Talysh language ===
- "Bəpe bьby" (Must be, 1930)
- "Tolьşə Ƶen" (Talysh woman, 1930)
- "Gьzьlə-goşyn" (Red army, 1931)
- "Andomi təmiz ogət" (Keep your body clean, 1932)
- "Jonzə Sor" (Eleven years, 1931)
- "Lenin", 1933
- "Esət" (Now, 1929)
- "Voş" (Rain, 1933)
- "Cьmь qagon" (My chickens, 1933)
- "Tyqə mahne" (Chaltyk song, 1933
- "Sьə ƣoşyni mahne" (Song of the Red Army, 1932)
- "Apreli Vistь həşt" (April 28, 1933)

=== Articles ===
- "Тоlьşə folqlori həxədə can gъləjъ sьxan" (A few words about Talysh folklore)
- "May 1" (1 May)
- "Din bo xəlgon tьjoqe" (Religion is the opium of the people)
- "Cь Lenini firgə rəhbərəti ƶijo zəhmətkəşə Tolьşon mədənijjət ruƶbə ruƶ bə nav şedə" (Supporters of the party of Lenin, the working people of the Talysh society are developing day by day)
- "Bə kaƣ-qiƶə zəvodi doəbedəni" (The poultry farm is missing)
- "1909-nə sori cьvononədə iƣlən bəpe be səvəd nьbyn həmə ьştə be səvodəti ni bьkə" (The youth born in 1909 should exterminate all ignorance, not a single uneducated should remain)
- "Həmmə ittifoğ staxanovçiyon iminçi muşavırədə kardə nitğ" (The first completed plans of the All-Union Stakhanovite movement, 1935)

== See also ==
- Boris Miller
- Talysh studies
- Talysh language
