= Shirali Akhundov =

Talysh politician (1886–1960)

Deputy Chairman of the Regional Council of the Mughan Soviet Republic

Personal details
- Born: March 10, 1886 Girdəni or Havzova village, Lenkoran uezd, Baku governorate of the Russian Empire
- Died: May 23, 1960 (aged 73–74) Baku, Azerbaijan Soviet Socialist Republic
- Resting place: Alley of Honor
- Education: Vocational school in Lankaran

Shirali Akhundov (Azerbaijani: Axundov Şirəli Baxşəli oğlu, March 10, 1886 - May 23, 1960) was a Talysh public politician, revolutionary, deputy chairman of the Regional Council of the Mugan Soviet Republic and сhairman of the Lankaran district executive Committee.

== Biography ==
Shirali Akhundov was born on March 10, 1886, into a peasant family in the village of Razi-Girdany/Havzova in Lankaran uezd. He received his primary education at a rural school and later at a three-year vocational school in Lankaran.

He was arrested as a dangerous revolutionary in 1908 for participating in a peasant movement and was sentenced to six months in prison. Later, until 1917 he led a rural cooperative. And once again he served a prison sentence for "inciting" the peasants to refuse to pay taxes to the landowners. In mid-1917, Shirali on the instructions of the party went to Mughan to establish contact with the Bolshevik organization.

At the end of 1918, on the instructions of the party, he got a job in Lankaran as the chairman of the Mughan Central committee . And through the cooperative, under the guise of goods, he received from Baku weapons, underground Bolshevik literature. Encrypted telegrams also came through the cooperative. In March 1919, Akhundov joined the ranks of the Bolshevik Party, and when Soviet power won over Mughan, Akhundov became a member of the Lankaran Soviet.

In 1919, Shirali Akhundov became the technical secretary of the Persian communist party Adalat.

At the final meeting of the Congress of Soviets in Lankaran, held on May 18, 1919, the congress elected the Mughan Regional Council of Peasant Workers and Red Army Deputies. The Regional Council was elected in the composition of 35 people. Among the deputies of the Regional Council were elected Shirali Akhundov. He also as an experienced employee in the organization of agriculture and fishery, became a member of the Regional Council of the National Economy.

After the fall of the Mughan Soviet Republic on July 2, 1919, Shirali, together with his comrade Bolshevik Bocharnikov went to sea on a boat, but later returned and created a partisan detachment.

After the establishment of Soviet power in Azerbaijan in 1920, in May of the same year Akhundov was elected chairman of the Lankaran district executive committee. In 1924, he was chairman of the Council of the National Economy of the Azerbaijan SSR. In 1925-1927 he was the chairman of the Quba executive committee, and for the second time in 1927-1929 he was the chairman of the Lankaran district executive committee. In 1920–1937, Akhundov was elected a member of the Central Committee of the Communist Party of Azerbaijan, and a member of the Transcaucasian Central Executive Committee.

=== Arrest ===
In 1938, Shirali Akhundov was arrested by the NKVD and accused as a member of the “Lankaran branch of the nationalist and rebel-terrorist organization”, which set “the goal of separating Lankaran from Azerbaijan” and the creation of the “Talysh autonomy” and sent into exile as former revolutionary. Shirali Akhundov also encountered the Talysh poet Zolfaghar Ahmadzadeh and was forced to give false evidence against him.

He was rehabilitated until 1958 and returned only after Stalin's death. A farm in the village of Havzova and a secondary school are named after Shirali Akhundov. In the city of Lankaran there is a street named after him.

His grave is located on the Alley of Honor in the city of Baku. In his native village of Havzova, a monument was erected in his honor.

== See also ==
- Talysh People's Party
- Mughan Soviet Republic
- Azerbaijan Communist Party (1920)
