= Caliber.az =

Azerbaijani news portal founded 2021

- Website type: News site
- Available in: Russian; English; Armenian
- Website: www.caliber.az
- Registration: Free
- Launched: 2021
- Current status: Active

Caliber.az is an Azerbaijani news portal established in 2021. The content is published in Russian, English and Armenian since March 10, 2010.

== Political affiliations ==
A 2025 report from OC Media described Caliber as being "pro-government". It has also promoted the Western Azerbaijan Irredentist concept.
