= Boyukaga Mirsalaev =

Talysh Soviet politician (1893–1938)

Boyukagha Mirsalaev
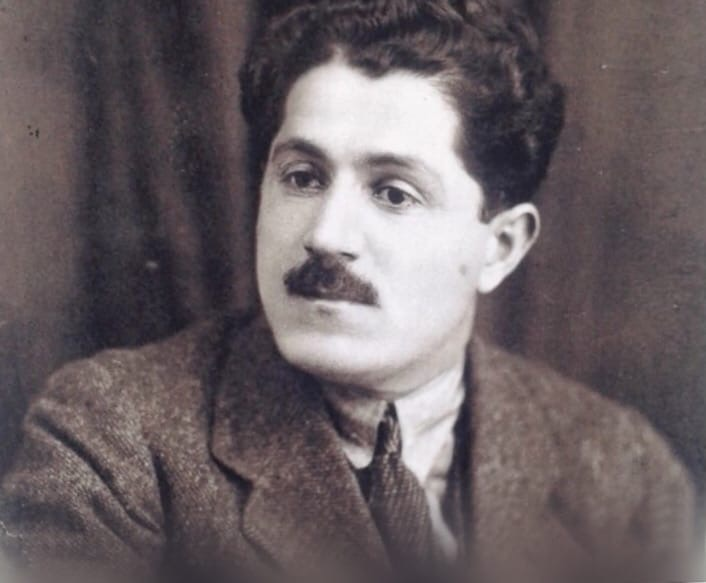

First Secretary of the Lankaran District
- Preceded by: Akhundov Shirali

Personal details
- Born: January 22, 1893; Rəzgov village, Lenkoran uezd, Baku governorate of the Russian Empire
- Died: January 8, 1938 (aged 44–45) unknown
- Political party: Azerbaijan Communist Party
- Spouse: Gyztamam
- Children: Mirsalam, Tughra, Maryam, Shafiga and Dilara
- Parent(s): Abulfat Mirsalo and Leila

Boyukagha Mirsalaev (Azerbaijani: Böyükağa Mirsalayev, Talysh: Bekəǧə Mirsalajev ; 1893–1938) was a Talysh public and political figure and second secretary of the Transcaucasian Communist Party.

== Biography ==
Boyukagha Mirsalaev was born in 1893 in the village of Razgov, Lenkoran uezd. He moved to Baku in 1906 at the age of 13 and began his career in the oil fields as a child. In addition to being a laborer he did not lag behind in improving his knowledge and literacy. He graduated from a three-year school in the city of Sabunchi.

In 1918 he returned to his native village of Razgov and worked as the secretary of the village council of the Mistan rural society. After the establishment of the Soviet Union Boyukagha completed a one-year training course for secretaries of committees for emergency situations in Moscow. Thanks to excellent conversational skills and high literacy he was admitted to the party in 1922.

In 1925 he was elected first secretary of the Qazakh district committee of the Communist Party of Azerbaijan and in 1927 of the Shaki district committee. In 1929, Mirsalayev was summoned to Baku and elected chairman of the board of "Azerittifaq". In 1930, he returned to his homeland, where he was appointed chairman of the executive committee of the Lankaran constituency and then first secretar.

In 1924–1925, Mirsalayev was elected a member of the Central Committee of Transcaucasia and the Central Committee of the Communist Party of Azerbaijan, and in 1927 he was elected to the XV Congress of the Central Committee.

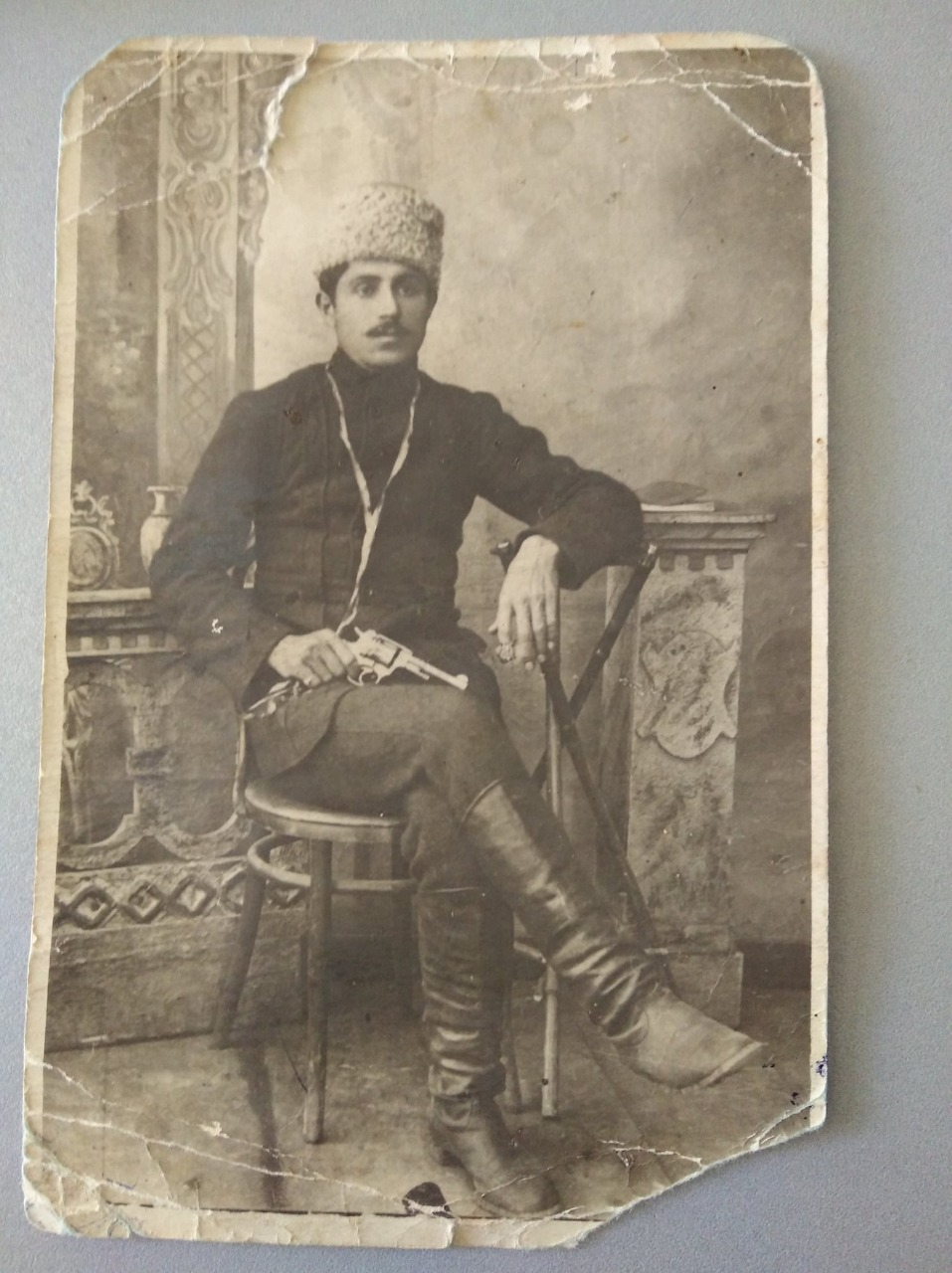
Boyukagha Mirsalaev during the period of the Mughan Soviet Republic

In 1930, Mirsalaev was sent to the Lankaran region as the first secretary. In the summer of 1930, the "Vostokkino" expedition made surveys in the Talysh region. The result was a short ethnographic film-essay "Talyshes", which shows footage of the speech of the chairman of the Lankaran Executive Committee Boukagha Mirsalaev.

In 1931–1933, Mirsalaev worked in the Transcaucasian Village Committee of the Communist Party of the Soviet Union and was the head of the department.

Mirsalaev also contributed to the construction of schools in the Lankaran district, raising the level of education, attracting young people to the field of literature and art and developing the Talysh language.

On January 21, 1931, under the editorship of Boyukagha Mirsalaev and secretary Muzaffar Nasirli, the Talysh newspaper "Sıə Tolış" ("Red Talysh") began to be published. The newspaper "Süə Tolış" has assumed important obligations in the study of the Talysh region, the Talysh language, literature and history.

In 1933, Mirsalaev, together with Nasirli translated the Manifesto of the Communist Party into the Talysh language.

=== Arrest ===
On November 15, 1936, Mirsalaev was arrested and accused as a participant since 1934 and the head of the "Lankaran branch of the nationalist and insurgent-terrorist organization" of bourgeois nationalists in Azerbaijan, which sets "the goal of separating Lankaran from Azerbaijan" and the creation of "Talysh autonomy" , "recruited personnel for rebel groups in the Lankaran district and prepared terrorist acts against the leadership of the Communist Party of Azerbaijan".

During the first interrogation on December 15, 1937, investigator Meshcharkov asked various questions to Mirsalaev, but Mirsalaev denied all charges. It can be seen from the materials of the investigation that investigator Meshcharkov detained more than 32 people together with Mirsalaev. These people were threatened and forced to give false evidence.

Meanwhile, Mirsalaev being the secretary of the Lankaran district party committee really carried out preparatory work for the creation of the Talysh Autonomous Soviet Republic, which in essence would be the restoration of the Mughan Soviet Republic.

By the decision of the Military Collegium of the Supreme Court of the USSR of January 7, 1938, Mirsalayev was found guilty under Articles 64, 70 and 73 of the Criminal Code of the Azerbaijan SSR and sentenced to death with confiscation of property. The sentence was carried out on the night of January 7–8, 1938.

Mirsalaev was rehabilitated on December 8, 1956. In Lankaran, a street was named after him.

On April 21, 2014, an event dedicated to the memory of Boyukagha Mirsalayev was held in Baku. At the event, excerpts from the life of Mirsalaev were heard, his merits in education were told and in particular the work done for the development of the Talysh language, poems were also read in honor of Mirsalaev in the Talysh language.

== Family ==
On April 9, 1938, his wife Gyztamam was deported to Kazakhstan for 10 years. She returned from exile only in 1946, died in 1947 and was buried in the village of Garmatuk. They had 5 children - Mirsalam, Tughra, Maryam, Shafiga and Dilara. His son Mirsalam married Tamara, the sister of the Soviet commander Hazi Aslanov.

== Bibliography ==
- «Çı HİK(b)F proğram ijən nizomnomə» (Program of the Russian Communist Party (Bolsheviks) adopted at the VIII Congress of March 18–23, 1919), Baku, 1935
- «Həmro Stalini həmə ittifoğ staxanovçijon iminçi muşavirədə kardə nitğ» (Speech by comrade J. Stalin at the first All-Union conference of the Stakhanovite movement), Baku, 1935
- (Translation) «Qommunistə firğə manifest». Q. Marqs, F. Engels ("Manifesto of the Communist Party". K. Marx, F. Engels), Baku, 1933

== See also ==
- Akhundov Shirali
- Azerbaijan Communist Party (1920)
- Talysh language
