= Ballabur =

Coordinates: 38°43′N 48°47′E

Ballabur is a village in the municipality of Şağlakücə in the Lankaran Rayon of Azerbaijan.
