= Rəzgov =

- Municipality
- Location within Azerbaijan
- Coordinates: 38°40′26″N 48°27′30″E
- Country: Azerbaijan
- Rayon: Lerik

Population
  - Total: 315
- Time zone: UTC+4 (AZT)
  - Summer (DST): UTC+5 (AZT)

Rəzgov (also, Razqov, Rəzğov, and Razgov) is a village and municipality in the Lerik Rayon of Azerbaijan. It has a population of 315.
