= Şağlakücə =

- Municipality
- Location within Azerbaijan
- Coordinates: 38°44′15″N 48°47′43″E
- Country: Azerbaijan
- Rayon: Lankaran

Population
  - Total: 3,873
- Time zone: UTC+4 (AZT)
  - Summer (DST): UTC+5 (AZT)

Şağlakücə (also, Şağlaküçə, Shaglazuza, and Shavlazuza) is a village and municipality in the Lankaran Rayon of Azerbaijan. It has a population of 3,873. The municipality consists of the villages of Şağlakücə and Ballabur.
