= Forced assimilation of Talysh people in Azerbaijan =

Talysh people were subjected to forced assimilation policy in Azerbaijan SSR. The policy was carried out jointly with the creation and propagation of the narratives by the authorities of the Azerbaijan SSR and Soviet ethnographers, alleging the "complete and voluntary assimilation of Talysh people into Azerbaijanis" in Soviet Azerbaijan. The narrative was created to justify the assimilation policy of the leadership of the Azerbaijan SSR towards the Talysh people and was distributed through various means, including encyclopedias, maps and textbooks. A similar policy was also pursued in relation to the Tats, Kurds, Lezgins, Georgian-Ingiloy, Udis and other peoples of the Azerbaijan SSR (see Forced assimilation in Azerbaijan). An alternative to assimilation during the time of Stalin was deportation of the Talysh people for those living close to borders.

== Course of events ==
According to the 1939 census, there were 87,510 Talyshs in the Azerbaijan SSR. Thus, the Talysh were the fifth largest nationality in Azerbaijan (after Azerbaijanis, Russians, Armenians and Lezgins), being one of the largest ethnic minorities in the republic. However, the 1959 census counted only 85 people of Talysh nationality in Azerbaijan. The official explanation of the authorities for the almost complete "disappearance" of the Talysh in this census was that "the Talysh voluntarily and en masse identified themselves as Azerbaijanis" in front of the census takers. In her book, Krista Goff shows, with documentary evidence, that the Moscow Central Statistical Office had plans to include the category of Talysh nationality in the 1959 census, but this category was excluded during the collection and preparation of census reports in Azerbaijan itself.

The leadership of the Azerbaijan SSR, according to Goff, used the census data in Soviet ethnography, creating a narrative about the "completely voluntary and natural assimilation" of the Talysh people. It was followed by the production of a large amount of ethnographic, linguistic, historical-geographical and other material, developing and reproducing narratives designed, according to Goff, to justify the national “erasure” of the Talysh and strengthen the official myth of their “voluntary assimilation”. Soviet ethnographers, describing what happened to the Talysh, emphasized their common features in culture and life with the Azerbaijanis and presented the "assimilation" of the Iranian-speaking Talysh by the Turkic-speaking Azerbaijanis as an "impressive achievement" of the Soviet state, "ethno-historical progress." So, for example, the Great Soviet Encyclopedia began to say that “in the USSR, the Talysh almost merged with the Azerbaijanis, who are very close in material and spiritual culture, therefore they were not singled out in the 1970 census”. According to researchers, the "erasing" of the Talysh from the census, as well as of some other peoples, was one of the main ways to increase the "titular" Azerbaijani majority in the republic and its homogenization.

This assimilation policy put great social, political and economic pressure on the Talysh and their daily life, stimulating them to "merge" with the titular Azerbaijani nation. So, for example, Talysh could not be registered as representatives of the Talysh nationality in official documents, and parents could not enroll their children in schools teaching in the Talysh language. Some Talysh petitioned the authorities for their rights to be identified as Talysh in government documents, but all these requests were denied by the authorities until 1989. Others, finding no other way out, adopted Azerbaijani identification in order to avoid discrimination in everyday life, for example, when applying for a job. Krista Goff also cites stories of Talysh who admitted that due to the stigmatization of their nationality, the lack of schools, books and other resources among the Talysh of Azerbaijan, as well as the lack of any preferences to be Talysh, they preferred Azerbaijani self-identification and the Azerbaijani language, even being afraid that their children may face discrimination if they speak Azerbaijani with a Talysh accent. Representatives of the Talysh people often assimilated these assimilation narratives about themselves, which they were told and which they found in encyclopedias, articles and other printed material.

From 1960 to 1989, the Talysh were not included in the censuses as a separate ethnic group, as they were considered part of the Azerbaijanis (Azerbaijani Turks).

In 1978, a part of the Talysh addressed the Central Statistical Office in Moscow and the Pravda newspaper with collective complaints that the census workers refused to register them as Talysh in the upcoming 1979 census. To which they received a response letter from the head of the Department of the All-Union Census A. A. Isupov, saying that the category of Talysh nationality would not be included in the census, because, Isupov wrote, referring to the ethnographic report on the assimilation of the Talysh, the Talysh are now Azerbaijanis.

In her book, Krista Goff provides interviews with the Talysh: “During these censuses [from 1959 to 1979] no one asked us about our nationality or self-identification. The census workers sat in the regional or village office and filled in the national composition of the population ahead of time based on orders from above. Then they asked us to fill in the other lines.” Respondents also shared stories with Goff about how census takers wrote them down as “Azerbaijanis” when they introduced themselves as Talysh, and denied the very existence of a Talysh nationality; in addition, when collecting information for the census, workers avoided the categories of mother tongue and nationality. During the preparation of materials for the 1970 census, some ethnographers and cartographers in Moscow expressed doubts about the census data, stating that the Azerbaijani authorities responsible for the census artificially assimilated the Talysh and "present their region as more ethnically homogeneous, and the Azerbaijani nation more consolidated" than in fact.

According to Goff, in order to justify the assimilation policy towards non-titular minorities, Azerbaijani officials and scholars from the 1950s increasingly began to talk about the "supposedly ancient local origin of the Azerbaijani nation", including minorities, including the Talysh, in its history. Thus, emphasizing that the Talysh and other peoples of the Azerbaijan SSR “descended from the same ancient population” as the Azerbaijanis (Azerbaijani Turks), they, according to Goff, tried to present the formation of the Turkic-centric Soviet Azerbaijani people as a “natural centuries-old process, and not the result of forced assimilation, as some minorities claimed."

Only in 1989, the Talysh nationality was returned to the census, immediately counting 21,196 Talyshes.

== Statistics ==
According to the 1897 census, 35,219 Talysh lived in the Russian Empire, and according to the 1926 census, there were 77,039 Talysh in the Azerbaijan SSR. From 1959 to 1989, the Talysh were not included in any censuses as a separate ethnic group, but were considered part of the Azerbaijani Turks, although the Talysh speak Iranian. In 1999, the Azerbaijani government stated that there were only 76,800 Talysh in the Republic of Azerbaijan, but this is considered below the actual number given problems with registration as Talysh. Some argue that the number of Talysh people inhabiting the southern regions of Azerbaijan is 500,000. According to the Talysh cultural center in Lankaran, in Masalliy there are 60% of Talysh people, in Lankaran only 2 villages are Turkic, Astara is completely Talysh, in Lerik only 2 villages are also Turkic. Obtaining accurate statistics is difficult due to the lack of reliable sources, mixed marriages and the decline in knowledge of the Talysh language.

== In modern Azerbaijan ==
Historical suppression of identity and inability to practice their culture and language instilled self-censorship in the Talysh. This makes it difficult to assess support for any kind of Talysh movement. According to Hema Kotecha, many Talysh fears that they will be considered linked to the separatist Talysh-Mugan Autonomous Republic, Russia or Armenia if they speak out openly and try to speak out about their beliefs in the public sphere. One case of the current repressions, when a school in Lerik wanted to invite a poet from Lankaran to meet with the children: the director was told that in this case he would be fired. Fear of the police is another reason for this silence, although support for secular democracy and shared Azeri-Talysh feelings about Nagorno-Karabakh also contribute to this.

International organizations such as Washington Profile, the Unrepresented Nations and Peoples Organization and Radio Free Europe / Radio Liberty have expressed concern over the arrest of Novruzali Mammadov, chairman of the Talish Cultural Center and chief editor of the newspaper "Tolyshi Sado". He was arrested and sentenced to 10 years on charges of high treason after his newspaper published articles claiming that the poet Nizami and the leader of the anti-Arab uprising Bābak Khorramdin were Talysh (and not Azerbaijanis, as officially considered in Azerbaijan).

The report of the "European Commission against Racism and Intolerance" (ECRI) noted that against the background of the cultivation of anti-Armenian sentiments in Azerbaijan, serious concerns are also expressed in connection with incitement of hatred towards the Talysh minority. ECRI notes with concern cases of abuse of legislation against members of minorities. This is how the former editor-in-chief of the only Talish-language newspaper "Tolyshi Sado", human rights activist Hilal Mammadov, was arrested and charged with drug possession. During his arrest, he was beaten and insulted on ethnic grounds. Hilal Mammadov was taken into custody after he posted a video about Talysh culture on the Internet, which received more than 20 million views. Leyla Yunus described his arrest as an example of pressure on representatives of national minorities. Earlier, the previous editor of the same Talysh newspaper, Novruzalli Mammadov, was arrested and died in prison.

== Notes ==
=== Bibliography ===
- Goff, Krista A. (2021). Nested Nationalism: Making and Unmaking Nations in the Soviet Caucasus. Ithaca, New York: Cornell University Press. ISBN 9781501753299.
