= OC Media =

Online news platform

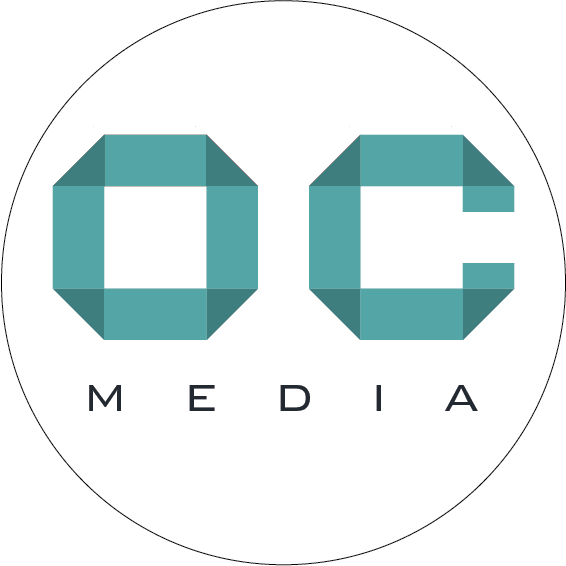
- Type: Online newspaper
- Founder(s): Mariam Nikuradze, Dominik K Cagara, and Caroline Sutcliffe
- Editor-in-chief: Robin Fabbro
- Founded: January 2017; 9 years ago
- Political alignment: Center-left
- Language: English
- Headquarters: Tbilisi
- Website: OC-Media.org

OC Media (Open Caucasus Media) is an independent English-language online news platform covering the North and South Caucasus regions.

== Overview ==
OC Media is a Tbilisi-based website founded in 2017 by journalists Mariam Nikuradze and Dominik K. Cagara and brings together journalists from throughout the Caucasus.

The site covers the South Caucasus nations of Armenia, Azerbaijan, and Georgia, Russia's North Caucasus republics, and the disputed territories of Abkhazia, Nagorno-Karabakh, and South Ossetia.

OC Media receives funding from different organizations and institutions as well as their readers. It has received funding from organizations such as UK Foreign and Commonwealth Office, Friedrich-Ebert-Stiftung, Open Society Foundations, the National Endowment for Democracy, the European Endowment for Democracy, the Ministry of Foreign Affairs of the Czech Republic, and the Thomson Reuters Foundation.

In March 2020, Georgian rights group the Human Rights Education and monitoring centre (EMC) appealed to the government after an undercover investigation by OC Media revealed poor working conditions in several textile factories in the country. They called on the Department of Labour Inspection to immediately inspect garment factories and for Parliament to pass legislative changes to prevent future violations of workers’ rights. In 2021, OC Media launched partnerships with five other local media organizations, including Mikroskop Media in Azerbaijan, CivilNet in Armenia, On.ge in Georgia, and Radio Marneuli and JNews in the southern Georgian regions of Kvemo Kartli and Samtskhe–Javakheti.

In October 2020, the site was temporarily taken offline by a cyberattack. The outlet's management attributed the attack to their coverage of the 2020 Nagorno-Karabakh war.

OC Media was awarded the 2023 Free Media Award.

In September 2023, OC Media revealed that the Speaker of the Georgian Parliament, Shalva Papuashvili, had contacted the site's institutional donors in an attempt to have their funding cut, after they refused to publish an op-ed he had authored. The Georgian Charter of Journalistic Ethics condemned the speaker's actions.
