= Kolatan, Astara =

Settlement in Astara District, Azerbaijan

Kolatan is a village and municipality in the Astara Rayon of Azerbaijan. It has a population of 1,192.
