= Talysh studies =

Talysh studies (Talysh: Tolışşunosәti) is one of the directions of Iranian studies, concentrated on the comprehensive study of Talyshistan, the Talysh language, the Talysh people, their history and culture.

== Headquarters ==
Talysh studies, being one of the areas of study of Iranian studies, are also studied and developed by scientists from Russia, Belarus, Azerbaijan, Armenia and the USA. At the Yerevan State University (YSU), at the Department of Iranian Studies, there is a master's program in Talysh Studies. One of the centers of Talysh studies is the Talysh National Academy, which aims to study and research Talyshistan in socio-economic, historical-ethnographic, archaeological, literary and linguistic terms. To achieve the set goals, the academy equips scientific expeditions to Talysh, convenes congresses, conferences, arranges excursions, public lectures, promotes the creation of scientific works on Talysh studies.

== History ==
=== Early periods ===
The impetus for the development of Talysh studies was the work of the famous linguist, historian, archaeologist and ethnographer Nikolai Marr "Talysh (on the issue of their national self-determination)" in 1922. The next founder of Talysh studies was the Soviet Iranian scholar, Talyshist, professor of Moscow State University, Boris Miller, who in 1902 was sent to the Lankaran uyezd together with A.M. Zavadsky. The expedition mainly covered Northern Talyshistan, but, as noted by B. Miller, he managed to visit the southern part of Talysh three times. In 1925, Miller was sent to the Talysh (probably not without the participation of Nikolai Marr), where he spent a month collecting significant field material and later in 1930 published the first collection of Talysh folklore "Talysh Texts". The same year, in "Scientific Notes", he published his other famous work – the article "On the question of the language of the population of Azerbaijan before the Turkish denunciation of this region", in which he proved that the Talysh language is a descendant of the ancient language, which existed before the Turkic migration – Āzarī. And already in 1929 the first Talysh book appeared, prepared by Talysh leaders Muzaffar Nasirli and Shokhub Mursalov, it was called “The First Book” (Talysh: Iminji Kitob). After the repressions of the late 1930s and after the 1950s, Talysh studies lost their applied significance. Boris Miller, however, remained devoted to the main work of his life – the study of the Talysh people – until his death. In 1953, being seriously ill, he managed to finalize and publish his voluminous monograph "Talysh language", which later became a classic for this direction of Iranian studies.

=== Modern days ===
As the Talysh researcher Igbal Abilov reports:

Since the late 1980s, through the efforts of Novruzali Mammadov, Avaz Sadekhzadeh and others, Talysh humanities and, of course, Talysh studies have been gradually reviving. Talysh scientists, who from the late 1960s - early 1970s, conducted scattered and unsystematic scientific research related to the Talysh, began to create common platforms for the dissemination, multiplication and development of these studies.
– In a national newspaper "Tolyshi sado" - "The Voice of Talysh".
