= Girdəni =

- Municipality
- Location within Azerbaijan
- Coordinates: 38°47′48″N 48°47′31″E
- Country: Azerbaijan
- Rayon: Lankaran

Population
  - Total: 4,688
- Time zone: UTC+4 (AZT)
  - Summer (DST): UTC+5 (AZT)

Girdəni (also, Girdany) is a village and municipality in the Lankaran Rayon of Azerbaijan. It has a population of 4,688.
