= Havzova =

Village in Azerbaijan

Coordinates: 38°47′N 48°43′E

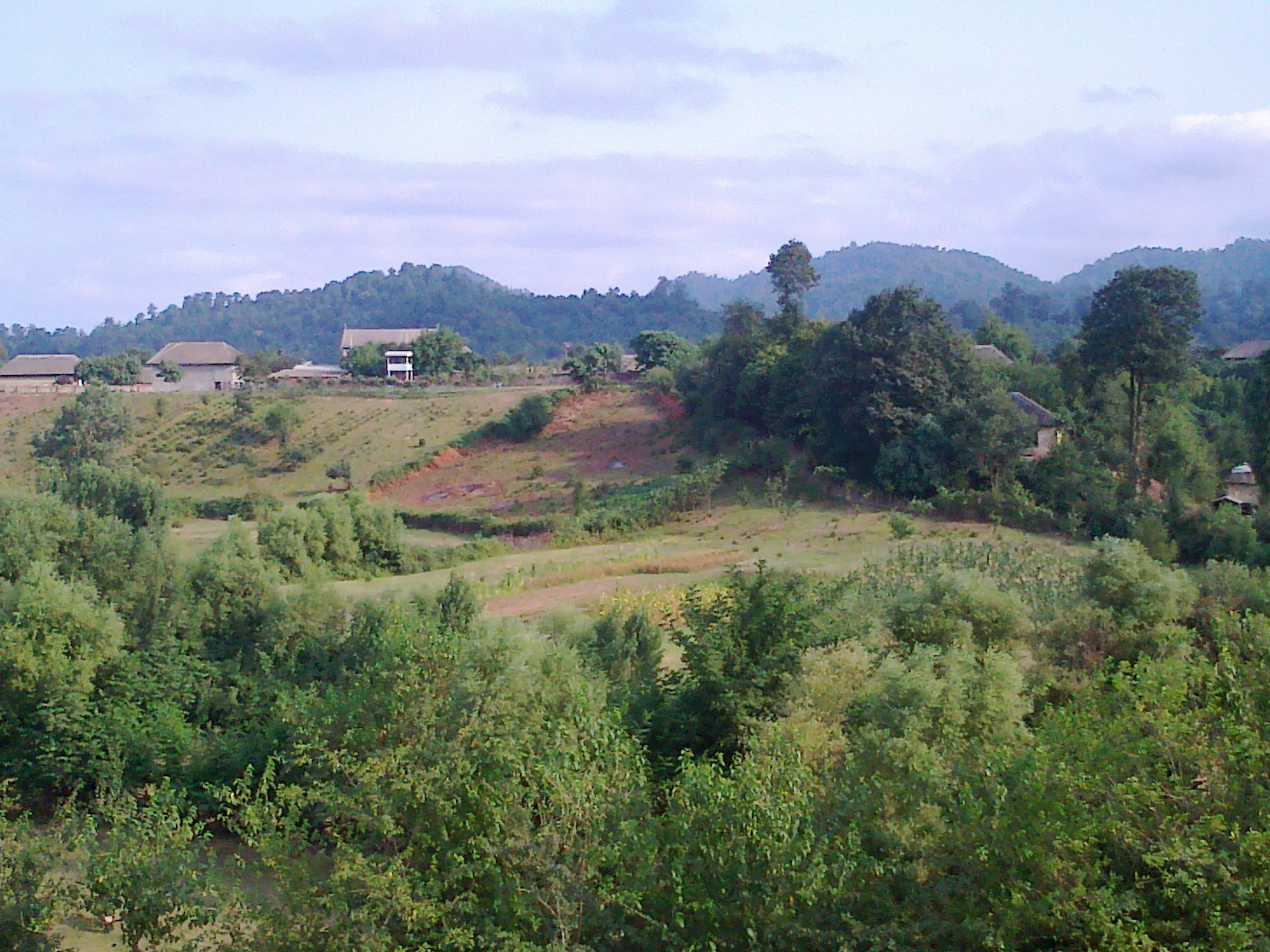
View of Havzova Village

Havzova is a village and municipality in the Lankaran Rayon of Azerbaijan. It has a population of 2,240.
