= Talysh National Academy =

Talysh National Academy (tal. Tolışi Milliyә Akademiyә) is a group of Talysh researchers registered in Riga in 2010 in order to preserve and develop Talysh literature and culture.

== The purpose of the academy ==
The purpose of the Talysh National Academy (TNA) is to study and research Talysh in socio-economic, historical-ethnographic, archaeological, literary and linguistic terms. To achieve the set goals, the academy equips scientific expeditions to Talysh, convenes congresses, conferences, arranges excursions, public lectures, promotes the creation of scientific works on Talysh studies. The head office of the Talysh National Academy is located in Minsk. Elnur Agayev, Doctor of Historical Sciences, is the President of the Talysh National Academy.

== Organization ==
The Talysh National Academy consists of two sections (Talysh Academy of Sciences, Talysh Academy of Arts) and 5 bureaus (socio-economic, historical and ethnographic, language and literature, folklore and songs, editorial). The academy consists of honorary and full members and corresponding members. Scientists known for their works on the study of Talysh can be elected as honorary members. The printed organ of the Talysh National Academy is "Bulletin of the Talysh National Academy" . In 2011, the first issue of the "Bulletin of the Talysh National Academy", the first international scientific publication dedicated to the comprehensive study of Talysh, was published. The working languages are Talysh, Russian and English. The chief editor of the Bulletin of the Talish National Academy is Igbal Abilov. The bulletin publishes samples of Talysh folklore, unpublished historical documents related to Talysh, and previously unpublished works of early researchers.
