= International Journal of Political Economy =

- Discipline: Political economy
- Language: English

Publication details
- Former name: International Journal of Politics
- Publisher: Routledge
- Frequency: Quarterly

Standard abbreviations
- ISO 4: Int. J. Political Econ.

Indexing
- International Journal of Political Economy
- ISSN: 0891-1916 (print); 1558-0970 (web)
- JSTOR: intejpoliecon
- OCLC no.: 1027883000
- International Journal of Politics
- ISSN: 0012-8783

Links
- Journal homepage; Online access

The International Journal of Political Economy is a peer-reviewed academic journal that publishes scholarly research on political economics. The journal was formerly published as International Journal of Politics. Many of the articles are English translations of scholarly work from around the world. Article themes include the conditions of economic growth, governmental intervention in the market economy, and modernization and democratization theories.
