= The Georgian Charter of Journalistic Ethics =

- Formation: 2009
- Type: NGO
- Purpose: Enhancing Ethical Journalism
- Location: Tbilisi, Georgia
- Chair: Nana Biganishvili
- Director: Lia Chakhunashvili
- Main organ: Board

The Georgian Charter of Journalistic Ethics is an independent union of journalists aimed at raising the social responsibility of media through protection of professional and ethical standards, and development of self-regulation mechanisms.

The Charter's Council is set up to consider complaints submitted against journalists, and decide whether or not any ethical principle has been violated in the issue in question. In addition, the organization implements various projects.

The Georgian Charter of Journalistic Ethics suspended the membership of the Alliance of Independent Press Councils of Europe (AIPCE) in 2022. The reason for this decision was that the Alliance did not support the request of the Ukrainian Press Council to expel the Russian Press Council from the Alliance. As a result, the Press Council of Ukraine left the Alliance. This request of Ukraine was supported by several members of the Alliance, including the Charter of Journalistic Ethics of Georgia, which considered that in light of the Russian invasion of Ukraine, extreme restrictions on media freedom, and large-scale propaganda, the Russian Press Council could not fulfill its duty and, therefore, could not be a member of the Alliance of Independent Press.

== History ==
The organization was founded on December 4, 2009. 137 journalists from various capital-based and regional media outlets signed to 11 principles, and took up the liability of their protection. The citizens, on the other hand, were allowed to apply to the Charter in the case of violation of ethical standards in the journalistic material.

The Charter's membership is ready to embrace any individual pursuing journalistic activity and sharing the Charter's goals. The aspirants need to apply in writing to the Charter's Council, which then decides on the admission within a period no later than 2 months following the application.

Initially, the council was solely considering claims submitted against the signee journalists, but the general meetings held in December 2013 resolved the consideration of applications against non-signee journalists as well. Consequently, the number of cases has been increasing since 2014, and as per the December 2016 data, 105 cases have already been considered.

The organizational structure has also been developing gradually. In 2012, Tamar Kordzaia was appointed executive director of the Charter, followed by the establishment of the Charter's Secretariat, headed by David Kldiashvili. At the beginning of 2013, Tamar Kordzaia quit her post, and was substituted by Tamar Rukhadze, was replaced by Nata Dzvelishvili in 2015. The Charter, an organization with a dynamic history of leadership transitions, saw the tenure of Nata Dzvelishvili as its executive director, who was succeeded by Giorgi Mgeladze. Mgeladze, known for his investigative journalism at Studia "Monitor" and his role as board chair for the Ethics Charter, gracefully concluded his service on the charter's board in 2019. In 2020, a new chapter unfolded as Mariam Gogosashvili assumed the role of executive director, steering the organization until the vibrant year of 2023. In November 2023, Lia Chakhunashvili became the Executive Director of the Charter. Following this, during the 15th general meeting held in December 2023, with active participation and voting from the Charter members, Nana Biganishvili was elected as the Chairman of the Board.

== Structure of the Charter ==
The Charter's supreme managing body is represented by the general meeting of the Charter's members, convoked by the Council in December every year, where the members introduce changes and additions to the Charter's regulations, and consider various issues.

The Charter's managing body is a nine-member council, elected by the signees at the general meeting. The Council members are selected through assignment of quotas: three members picked out from journalists /editors registered in Tbilisi, and 6 members out of journalists/editors registered outside Tbilisi.

The council's composition is updated on yearly basis by one-third. The Council elects its head for a period of one year. The Council meetings are held at least monthly, apart from situations when no cases have been prepared for consideration in the council, with no other issues pending.

The Council appoints the executive director through a contest for one-year term. Control over the compliance with the Charter's regulations and the spending of funds or other assets according to prescribed goals is realized by the Revision Commission of the Charter, composed of three members selected for a two-year term by the general meeting. The Revision Commission then appoints its head within a month following its establishment, and follows its own set of rules.

== Rules for consideration of claims ==
Any natural person or legal entity is entitled to apply to the Charter concerning a journalistic violation. The proceedings are initiated by the Charter on the basis of claim submission, registered by the Secretariat of the Charter's Council, and forwarded to the council after checking of the formalities for the further decision.

The applications are examined at the public session of the Charter, with the participation of both the claimant and defendant. Following the consideration of the case, the Charter takes a decision as to whether the principle specified by the claimant has been violated in the disputable material. The decisions are published on the Charter's webpage.

== Council ==
- Nana Biganishvili (Studia Monitori)
- Nino Ramishvili (Studia Monitori)
- Vladimer Ckhitunidze (Radio Marneuli)
- Saba Tsitsikashvili (Qartli.ge)
- Nino Kapanadze (Chemi Kharagauli)
- Tinatin Zazadze (SKNEWS)
- Nino Gelashvili (MDF)
- Irakli Mskhiladze (Ajara TV)
- Tiko Davadze (Radio Marneuli)

== Chairman of the Board ==
- 2023-Current - Nana Biganishvili
- 2022-2023 - Khatia Ghoghoberidze
- 2021-2022 - Tamar Rukhadze
- 2020- 2021 - Kamila Mamedova
- 2018-2020 - Nana Biganishvili
- 2016–2018 – Giorgi Mgeladze
- 2014–2016 – Nino Zuriashvili
- 2013–2014 – Natia Kuprashvili
- 2012–2013 – Giorgi Mgeladze
- 2011–2012 – Zviad Koridze
- 2009–2011 – Eter Turadze

== Executive Director ==
- 2023 - Lia Chakhunashvili
- 2020-2023 - Mariam Gogosashvili
- 2019-2020 - Giorgi Mgeladze
- 2015–2019 – Nata Dzvelishvili
- 2013–2015 – Tamar Rukhadze
- 2012–2013 – Tamar Kordzaia

== Charter’s Projects ==
=== Media-monitoring ===
The Charter of Journalistic Ethics has a group of monitors that has implemented a number of election, as well as thematic monitoring efforts since 2010:

- Monitoring of parliamentary elections – 2012
- Monitoring of presidential elections – 2013
- Monitoring of crime coverage in media – 2012
- Monitoring of children's issues coverage in media – 2013
- Monitoring of Open Society- Georgia Foundation projects – 2013
- Coverage of children's issues in media – stage II – 2014–2015
- Coverage of gender-related topics in media – 2014
- Media monitoring on Programming of the Public Service Broadcasters
- Coverage of 2016 Parliamentary elections

=== Mediachecker.ge ===
Mediachecker is a media critique platform, established in 2013 within the framework of the “enhancement of the self-regulation of media through civil and legal education” project. The webpage provides the results of the analysis of the TV, online and press production. The group of monitors observes media outlets on a daily basis and prepares articles, short news and op-ed columns concerning the identified violations and deficiencies. Other civil society members have, meanwhile, an opportunity to express their opinion on media in the Blogs section.

=== Libcenter.ge ===
LibCenter has been functioning since 2013, and holds a contest twice a year for students’ participation in the project. The students selected are engaged in various activities during a period of 6 months- writing blogposts, news, preparing video-materials on the current events, and covering rallies. The project as well implies holding of public lectures and discussions with civil society over topics concerned with liberal and democratic values.
