= Boris Miller =

Soviet Iranianist (1877–1956)

- Born: Boris Vsevolodovich Miller; 12 November 1877; Moscow, Russian Empire
- Died: 6 August 1956 (aged 78); Moscow, Soviet Union
- Education: Moscow State University; Lazarev Institute of Oriental Languages
- Known for: Iranian studies
- Awards: Order of the Red Banner of Labour
- Scientific career
- Fields: Philology
- Workplaces: Moscow State University

Boris Vsevolodovich Miller (Russian: Борис Всеволодович Миллер, 12 November 1877 – 6 August 1956) was a Soviet Iranianist scholar, professor at Moscow State University, and doctor of sciences in philology.

== Biography ==
He was born in 1877 in the family of the folklorist and ethnographer Vsevolod Miller (1848–1913) and Evgenia Viktorovna (née Nasonova, 1857–1927), he is also the nephew of the zoologist Nikolai Nasonov.

In 1895 he graduated with a gold medal from the 6th classical men's gymnasium and in 1899 graduated from the law faculty of Moscow University, and in 1903 from the Lazarev Institute of Oriental Languages.

In 1902 he was sent to Lankaran uezd by the Council of Special Classes. The expedition covered mainly Northern Talyshstan, but as Miller notes he managed to call in the southern part of Talyshstan three times. In 1903–1917 he was in the diplomatic service in Muslim countries. After the revolution of 1917 he served in the Red Army, at the M. V. Frunze Military Academy with the rank of komdiv (division commander) he headed the department of oriental languages. He worked at the Academy of Sciences of the Soviet Union, and was the head of the sector of Iranian philology at the Institute of Linguistics of the USSR Academy of Sciences.

In 1919 he moved from Moscow to Saint Petersburg, where he worked in the Caucasian section of the "Commission for the Study of the Tribal Composition of Russia," led by Nikolai Marr. Since 1935 professor and since 1939 doctor of sciences in philology at the Moscow Institute of Oriental Studies and researcher at the Institute of Linguistics of the Academy of Sciences of the USSR. He gave courses in Persian language and literature and the history of Iran.

From 1943 to 1953 he was the head of the Department of Iranian Philology of the Faculty of Philology of Moscow State University.

Boris Miller was also the scientific adviser of the Talysh scholar Leah Pireyko. After his illness in 1953, he entrusted her to continue his research in the field of the Talysh language, advised her and provided all possible assistance. Although Leah Pireiko admitted that Miller did not let her learn the Talysh language for a very long time and pushed her to study Kurdish.

From 1932 to 1956 the life of professor Miller and his family was connected with the town of Medyn, where he came to his dacha for the summer with a break for the years of the war. For the last 4 years of his life, he lived in Medyn all year round, continuing his scientific work until the last days of his life.

He died on 6 August 1956. He was buried in the cemetery of the town of Medyn.

At the beginning of October 2010, in Moscow a Talysh figure scientist Gilal Mammadov had a conversation with Leah Pireyko and she told a lot of interesting things about her teacher Miller. And in 2011, G. Mammadov found and visited the grave of Boris Miller in the town of Medyn. On the same train, G. Mammadov managed to find an image of the professor and have a conversation with his granddaughter Natalya Somik.

== Awards ==
- Order of the Red Banner of Labour (06.10.1945)

== Bibliography ==
As a student, under the influence of his father, Caucasian scholar Vsevolod Miller he became interested in ethnography as a result of which the articles "In Karachay” (1899), "From the field of customary law of Karachays” (1902) were published. He is also the author of numerous works on the philology of living Iranian languages of the Western group – Persian, Talysh, Tat and Kurdish, including:

- Из области обычного права карачаевцев (From the field of customary law of Karachays. Moscow, 1902)
- Турецкие народные песни: Музыкальные тексты с переводами и объяснениями Бориса Миллера. (Turkish Folk Songs: musical texts with translations and explanations by Boris Miller. Moscow, 1903)
- Кочевые племена Фарсистана // Восточный сборник (Nomadic tribes of Farsistan // Eastern collection, 1916. Book 11)
- Предварительный отчёт о поездке в Талыш летом 1925 г. (Preliminary report on the trip to Talysh in the summer of 1925. Baku, 1926)
- Конспект лекций по истории Персии (Abstract of lectures on the history of Persia. Moscow, 1926)
- Таты и их расселение и говоры: материалы и вопросы (Tats and their resettlement and dialects: materials and questions. Baku, 1929 – Proceedings of the Survey and study of Azerbaijan, No. 8, issue 7)
- Талышские тексты: тексты, русский перевод и талышско—русский—французский словарь (Talysh texts: texts, Russian translation and Talysh-Russian-French dictionary. Moscow, 1930)
- Персидско-русский словарь (Persian-Russian dictionary, about 35,000 words, 1950, 1960)
- Талышский язык (Talysh language. Moscow, 1953)
- «Образцы говора курдов советского Азербайджана, записанные в августе 1933 г. в селе Минкенд, Агбулаг, Бозлу и Каракешиш» ("Samples of the dialect of the Kurds of Soviet Azerbaijan, recorded in August 1933 in the village of Minkend, Agbulag, Bozlu and Karakeshish", 1956)

== See also ==
- Talysh language
- Iranian studies
