= Kolatan, Masally =

Village in Masally District, Azerbaijan

Kolatan is a village and municipality in the Masally Rayon of Azerbaijan. It has a population of 3,702.
