= Zulfugar Ahmedzade =

Talysh poet, public and political figure, publicist and translator

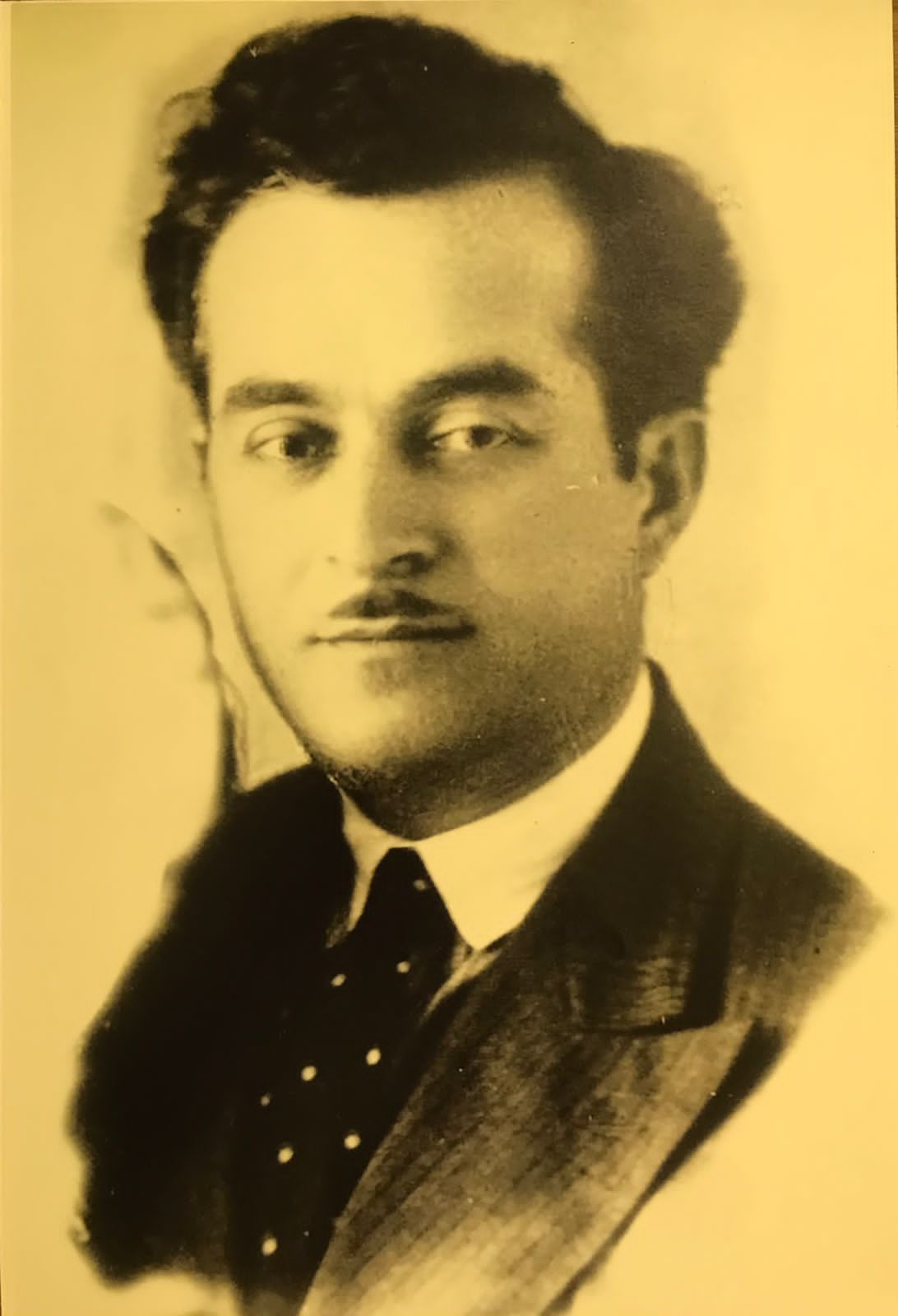
- Born: Pensar
- Writing career
- Language: talysh

Zulfugar Ahmedzade (Talysh: Zulfuğar Əhmədzodə, Azerbaijani: Zülfüqar Əhmədzadə; June 14, 1898, Pensar - June 9, 1942, Mariinsk) was a Talysh poet, public and political figure, publicist, translator, leader of the Talysh national and cultural revival in the 1930s.

== Life ==
Zolfaghar Ahmedzadeh was born in 1898 in the village of Pensar (now in the Astara region of Azerbaijan) into a poor peasant Talysh family. Parents were engaged in serf agriculture, had a small rice (chaltych) plantation, and were serfs (raiyats) of the famous Mir Akhmed Khan Talyshinsky.

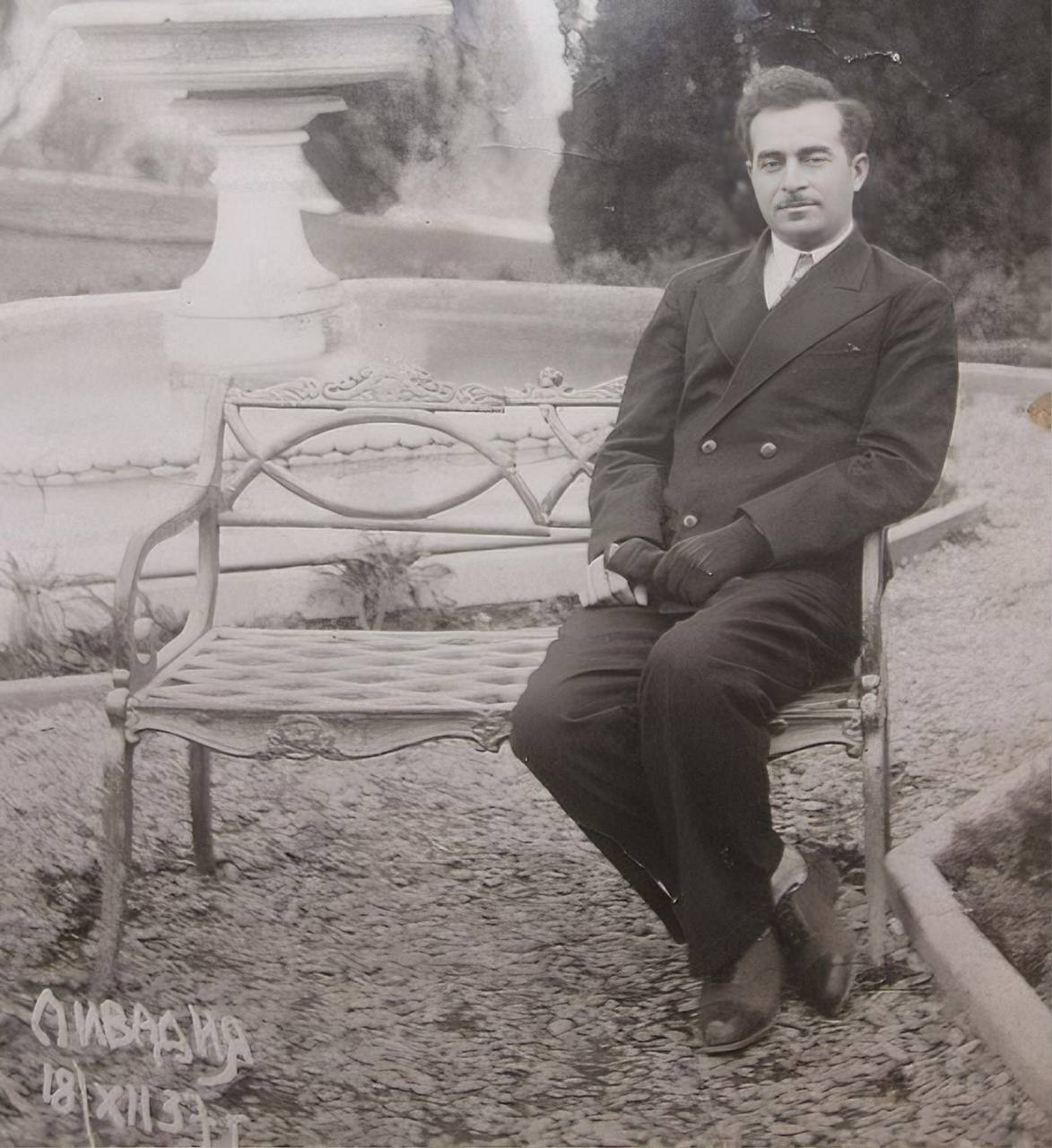

In his autograph, Ahmedzadeh tells the case that the guards of Mir Ahmad Khan Talyshinsky beat his old man's father to unconsciousness, because he could not give the khan a bakhra in time. Parents died before World War I. At the age of 9, on the initiative of his father, he was hired by a village teacher, where he studied for 2 years and learned to read, write and speak Persian. In 1913-1914 he graduated from a village school (mektab) in the Persian language in his native village of Pensar, learned to speak and write in Persian, and began to study the Arabic language. In 1916-1917 he graduated from a 2-grade rural school also in the village of Pensar. Having a colossal desire to study, I went to Lankaran and entered the 1st group of the school there. When I moved to the 2nd group, my father died and he left his studies and started farming. Worked in this way for 2 years in agriculture. At the age of 12, the ability to draw and poetry was manifested. Seeing such an ability, a friend of his father, a resident of the city of Lankaran, citizen Abulfas Hasanov, persuaded him to leave agriculture and go into trade. He took him as a companion and gave him money. With this money, Ahmedzadeh began trading and continued this business for 1 year, but being young and inexperienced, and besides not having an absolute desire to trade, he not only did not earn, but even spent the available funds. At the same time, there was one teacher in the village, Russian by origin, Ahmedzadeh entered him and studied Russian for 4 months.

Political activity

In 1916, when he was 19 years old, he joined the “Ədalət” party of the Lankaran organization, as an agitpropagandist and worked in the city of Lankaran in the surrounding villages. For the most part he worked in his village. Working in this way, he tried in every possible way to attract public opinion to the side of the party "Ədalət" and agitated to fight against the power of khans and beks. He led an active Bolshevik agitation in Talysh villages. As a result of this struggle, in May 1919, when the counter-revolutionary gang took the village of Pensar for the second time, they destroyed his property, burned down his house and killed (cut off the head) his brother Jabrail Ahmedzade. In August 1919, when the Musavat army with counter-revolutionary gangs entered the city of Lankaran, he was beaten more than once. After writing a feuilleton under the title "Mənə nə" ("What to Me") exposing the Musavat bailiffs, officers (crushed), khans, beks and the Musavat party, he was severely beaten by one of the Musavat criminals Eyyub Efendi, this was already on the eve of the April revolution when he worked in the underground organization "Hummet" AKP (b) in the mountains. Lankaran. He joined the party with the help of comrade Kalantarov Mutallib, who knew him in the period 1917–1918. as a young revolutionary. In the underground he carried out agitation work among the working people of the Talysh. After the April Revolution, he became a teacher in his village of Pensar and worked in a communist cell as chairman of the cell. In the period 1920–1921. took an armed part against the counter-revolutionary gangs in Astara and Lankaran regions. In 1920–1921.

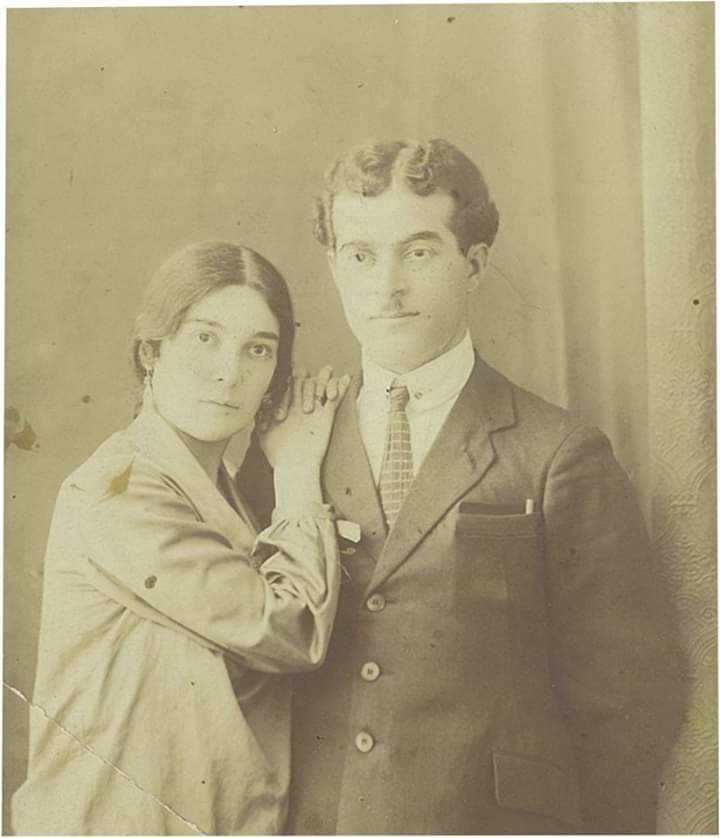
Zulfugar with wife

In the academic year, I got a job at the Astrakhanbazar school of the Lenkoransky district, as the head of the school. At the end of the academic year, the party mobilized and appointed the 4th Dairapartkom in Lankaran as a responsible instructor. Prior to that, in 1920, he graduated from a 3-month pedagogical course in Lankaran, and at that time, being a responsible instructor, entered and completed a 6-month pedagogical course in Lankaran. At the end of 1921 he was appointed commissioner for the fight against bandits and worked in the executive committee. He fought intensively against the bandits in the mountains, disarmed and caught them in 1922 and in 1923. Conducted the duties of the chairman of the Deiramispolkom in Zuvand. In 1924 he was the head of the land department at the Lankaran PEC, in 1925 he was in charge of the UONO of the Lankaran district. On 1 August 1926 was sent to the Kurdistansky Uyezd and appointed head of the OVU. In 1930 he graduated from the II course of the correspondence pedagogical institute, then entered Az. GNII in the department of language and literature, from where at the end of the 1st year he was mobilized. He was a teacher by profession, headed the department on national minorities of the publishing house "Azərnəshr".

== Sources ==
- Goff, Krista A. (2021). Nested Nationalism: Making and Unmaking Nations in the Soviet Caucasus. Ithaca, NY: Facts on File. ISBN 9781501753275.
