= 1884 in Iran =

- Decades
- See also: Other events of 1884; Years in Iran

The following lists events that happened during 1884 in Qajar era.

== Incumbents ==
- Monarch: Naser al-Din Shah Qajar

== Births ==
- December 20 – Ehsanollah Khan Dustdar, an early twentieth century Iranian Marxist revolutionary and leader of the Persian Socialist Soviet Republic.
- ? – Ahmad Amir-Ahmadi, military leader and cabinet Minister of Iran.
- ? – Azizollah Zarghami, Military Officer.
- ? – Gulamrza Sharifzade, Azerbaijani actor, publisher, engineer, director of the Azerbaijan State Theater.
- ? – Mahmoud Djam, Prime Minister of Iran from 1935 to 1939.
- ? – Menahem Shemuel Halevy, Iranian rabbi.
