= Çanaqbulaq =

Çanaqbulaq or Chanakhbulak may refer to:

- Çanaqbulaq, Qabala
- Çanaqbulaq, Yardymli
