= Şəfəqli =

- Municipality
- Location within Azerbaijan
- Coordinates: 38°54′02″N 48°09′21″E
- Country: Azerbaijan
- Rayon: Yardymli

Population
  - Total: 1,865
- Time zone: UTC+4 (AZT)
  - Summer (DST): UTC+5 (AZT)

Şəfəqli is a village and the second most populous municipality, after the capital Yardımlı, in the Yardymli Rayon of Azerbaijan. It has a population of 1,865. The municipality consists of the villages of Şəfəqli, Ciribul, and Gilar.

== Notable natives ==
- Jamil Niftaliyev — national hero of Azerbaijan
