= Zəngələ =

- Location within Azerbaijan
- Coordinates: 38°53′N 48°22′E
- Country: Azerbaijan
- Rayon: Yardymli
- Municipality: Vərov
- Time zone: UTC+4 (AZT)
  - Summer (DST): UTC+5 (AZT)

Zəngələ (also, Zangyala and Zangyalya) is a village in the Yardymli Rayon of Azerbaijan. The village forms part of the municipality of Vərov.
