= Bazayran =

Bazayran or Bozayran may refer to:

- Bozayran, Azerbaijan
- Bëyuk Bozayran, Azerbaijan - "Greater Bazayran"
- Baladzha Bozayran, Azerbaijan - "Lesser Bazayran"
