= Porsova =

Porsova may refer to:

- Porsova, Jalilabad, Azerbaijan
- Porsova, Yardymli, Azerbaijan
