= Şiləvəngə =

Şiləvəngə or Shilavegyakh or Shilavengya or Shilyavyangya or Şiläväng may refer to:

- Şiləvəngə, Jalilabad, Azerbaijan
- Şiləvəngə, Yardymli, Azerbaijan
