= Gendərə =

Gendərə or Gëndere may refer to:

- Gendərə, Ismailli, Azerbaijan
- Gendərə, Yardymli, Azerbaijan
