= Cirimbel =

Cirimbel may refer to:

- Ciribul, Azerbaijan
- Dzherimbel, Azerbaijan
