= Noravar =

Azerbaijani village and municipality

Noravar is a village and municipality in the Yardymli Rayon of Azerbaijan. The municipality consists of the villages of Noravar and Əngəvül
