= Keçələkəran =

- Location within Azerbaijan
- Coordinates: 38°55′41″N 48°21′15″E
- Country: Azerbaijan
- Rayon: Yardymli
- Municipality: Əvçədulan
- Time zone: UTC+4 (AZT)
  - Summer (DST): UTC+5 (AZT)

Keçələkəran is a village in the Yardymli Rayon of Azerbaijan. The village forms part of the municipality of Əvçədulan.
