= Onoba =

Onoba may refer to:

- Huelva, Spain
- Honuba, Azerbaijan
- Ónavas, Mexico
- Onoba (gastropod), a genus of gastropods in the family Rissoidae
