= Alçabulaq =

- Municipality
- Location within Azerbaijan
- Coordinates: 38°56′16″N 48°17′25″E
- Country: Azerbaijan
- Rayon: Yardymli

Population
  - Total: 820
- Time zone: UTC+4 (AZT)

Alçabulaq (formerly Sokhuldzhan) is a village and municipality in the Yardymli Rayon of Azerbaijan. It has a population of 820.
