= Osnakəran =

- Municipality
- Location within Azerbaijan
- Coordinates: 38°52′37″N 48°14′51″E
- Country: Azerbaijan
- Rayon: Yardymli

Population
  - Total: 780
- Time zone: UTC+4 (AZT)
  - Summer (DST): UTC+5 (AZT)

Osnakəran (also, Osnagaran and Osnakeran) is a village and municipality in the Yardymli Rayon of Azerbaijan. It has a population of 780.
