= Yeni Abdinli =

Coordinates: 38°55′N 48°09′E

Yeni Abdinli is a village and municipality in the Yardymli Rayon of Azerbaijan. It has a population of 366. The municipality consists of the villages of Yeni Abdinli, Abdinli, and Xanbulaq.
