= Institute of Caucasian Studies =

Institute of Caucasian Studies:

- Institute of Caucasian Studies (Azerbaijan)
- Institute of Caucasian Studies, now Ivane Javakhishvili Institute of History and Ethnology, in Georgian
