= Xanbulaq =

Xanbulaq may refer to:

- Xanbulaq, Agsu, a village and municipality in the Agsu Rayon of Azerbaijan
- Xanbulaq, Yardymli, a village in the municipality of Yeni Abdinli in the Yardymli Rayon of Azerbaijan
