= Anzov =

- Municipality
- Location within Azerbaijan
- Coordinates: 38°52′12″N 48°16′10″E
- Country: Azerbaijan
- Rayon: Yardymli

Population
  - Total: 901
- Time zone: UTC+4 (AZT)
  - Summer (DST): UTC+5 (AZT)

Anzov (also, Anzo) is a village and municipality in the Yardymli Rayon of Azerbaijan. It had a population of 901.
