= Əvçədulan =

- Municipality
- Location within Azerbaijan
- Coordinates: 38°55′N 48°21′E
- Country: Azerbaijan
- Rayon: Yardymli

Population
  - Total: 409
- Time zone: UTC+4 (AZT)

Əvçədulan (also, Avchadulan) is a village and municipality in the Yardymli Rayon of Azerbaijan. It has a population of 409. The municipality consists of the villages of Əvçədulan and Keçələkəran.
