= Gulamrza Sharifzade =

Azerbaijani actor and politician (1884–1924)

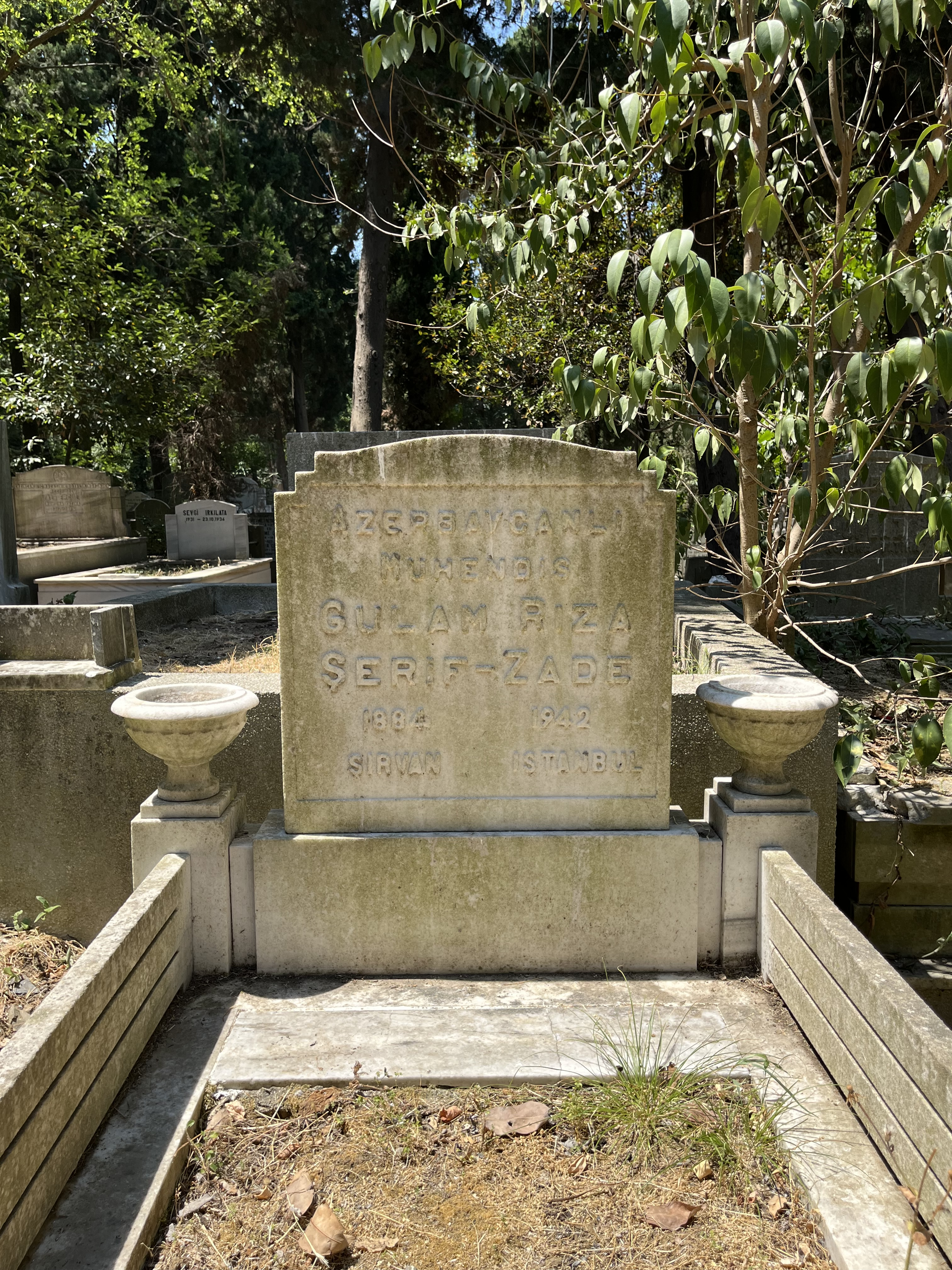
- The grave of Ghulam Mirza Sharifzadeh in Feriköy Cemetery
- Born: 1884; Shamakhi
- Died: 1924 (aged 39–40)
- Occupation: Director of the Azerbaijan State Theatre
- In office August 1919 – 27 April 1920

Gulamrza Sharifzade also known as Gulamrza Sharifov (1884–1942), was an actor, director, publisher, and politician. He served as the director of the Azerbaijan State Theater in 1919–1920.

After the April occupation, he went into exile and became one of the founders of the Musavat Party's Tehran committee and an active member of the Azerbaijani Emigrants' Aid Society.

He was the elder brother of Abbas Mirza Sharifzade, an actor, director, and victim of repression.

== Life and activities ==
=== Early years ===
Gulamrza Mirza Abdulrasul Sharifzade was born in 1884 in the Yukhari Gala neighborhood of Shamakhi. After the devastating earthquake in Shamakhi in 1902, his family left the city and moved to Baku.

He engaged in publishing with Abbasgulu Kazimzadeh, producing books and postcards. Their store also served as a secret meeting place. From 1914 to 1920, Gulamreza Sharifzadeh was the publisher of Basiret, a weekly political, social, and literary newspaper printed in Azerbaijani in Baku.

In addition to his work as a publisher, Gulamreza Sharifzadeh was also known as a theater figure and actor. In 1907, he performed alongside Huseynqulu Sarabski in the role of Jafarqulu Khan in Abdurrahim bey Hagverdiyev's play Aga Mahammad Shah Qajar, staged by the "Nijat" Society. He joined the theater troupe formed by the "Nijat" Society in 1909. Sharifzadeh wrote plays such as Anushiravan-i Adil and Molla Nasreddin and translated works for theater, including Huseyn Bedreddin's Amir Abul Ula, Mohammad Rufat's Ibrahim Bey, and Mohammad Ehsan's Jovdat Bey. His play Molla Nasreddin was staged in 1910. On November 30, 1910, the "Nijat" Society celebrated the 25th anniversary of actor Jahangir Zeynalov's stage career, where Sharifzadeh congratulated the actor on behalf of the Muslim drama troupe. During World War I, when Azerbaijan extended fraternal assistance to Turkey, Sharifzadeh distinguished himself in the efforts. Programs for performances in which he appeared with his brother referred to Gulamreza as "Sharifzadeh-1" and Abbasmirza as "Sharifzadeh-2."

After the establishment of the Azerbaijan Democratic Republic, the Turkish State Theater was founded in August 1919, and Gulamreza Sharifzadeh was appointed its director.

=== In exile ===
After the Soviet occupation, Gulamrza Sharifzade, along with Mahammad Ali Rasulzade and Jafar Jafarov, established the Tehran Committee of the Musavat Party. Historian Musa Gasimli notes that between 1922 and 1926, Tehran became the main hub for the Musavat Party in Iran. During this period, émigrés formed the Azerbaijan Refugee Aid Society, which provided material and moral support to refugees, helped them find jobs, met their healthcare needs, organized cultural activities, and more. The society's unofficial activities included recruiting resistance groups near the Iran-Azerbaijan border and conducting anti-Bolshevik propaganda. Mahammad Ali Rasulzadeh led the organization, with Gulamrza Sharifzade as one of his closest allies. Due to his active opposition to Soviet rule, Sharifzadeh was constantly persecuted. In 1930, Soviet-backed newspapers in Baku published defamatory articles about prominent figures of the Azerbaijan Democratic Republic, including Sharifzade. He was subjected to insults, caricatured, and ridiculed in satirical poems.

Sharifzade lived in Iran for some time before relocating to Turkey. He died in Istanbul in 1942, and his grave is located in Feriköy Cemetery.

== Memory ==
- In 2018, many neglected Azerbaijani graves at the Feriköy Cemetery, including that of Gulamreza Sharifzadeh, were restored. At the entrance of the cemetery, a monument was erected in honor of the centenary of the establishment of the Azerbaijan Democratic Republic. The monument bears the flags of Azerbaijan and Turkey, along with the official phrase "One Nation, Two States," and the names of the founders of the Republic, including Gulamreza Sharifzadeh.
- In 2024, a book titled "Son mənzili İstanbul olan azərbaycanlılar" (translated as "Azerbaijanis Whose Final Resting Place is in Istanbul") by Dilgam Ahmad was published. The book includes information about Gulamreza Sharifzadeh.

== Family ==
Gulamrza Sharifzade was born into the family of Mirza Rasul Sharifzade and Farrukh beyim. His father, Mirza Rasul, taught at the new "Usul-i-Cədid" school founded by Seyid Azim Shirvani. His mother was a homemaker.

His brother, Abbas Mirza Sharifzade, was active in the theater troupes of the "Nicat" and "Sefa" cultural-educational societies, working as an actor and director. In 1937, Abbas Mirza was arrested by the Azerbaijan SSR NKVD, accused of espionage, and executed.
