= Köryədi =

- Municipality
- Location within Azerbaijan
- Coordinates: 38°54′58″N 48°16′42″E
- Country: Azerbaijan
- Rayon: Yardymli

Population
  - Total: 1,360
- Time zone: UTC+4 (AZT)
  - Summer (DST): UTC+5 (AZT)

Köryədi (also, Këryadi, Kër”yadi, and Kergyady) is a village and municipality in the Yardymli Rayon of Azerbaijan. It has a population of 1,360.
