= Honuba Şıxlar =

- Municipality
- Location within Azerbaijan
- Coordinates: 38°57′N 48°26′E
- Country: Azerbaijan
- Rayon: Yardymli

Population
  - Total: 458
- Time zone: UTC+4 (AZT)
  - Summer (DST): UTC+5 (AZT)

Honuba Şıxlar (also, Honuba-Şıxlar, Gonoba-Shikhlyar, and Khonuba Shykhlyar) is a village and municipality in the Yardymli Rayon of Azerbaijan. It has a population of 458. The municipality consists of the villages of Honuba Şıxlar and Zeynələzir.
