= Telavar =

- Municipality
- Location within Azerbaijan
- Coordinates: 38°58′49″N 48°22′28″E
- Country: Azerbaijan
- Rayon: Yardymli

Population
  - Total: 1,221
- Time zone: UTC+4 (AZT)
  - Summer (DST): UTC+5 (AZT)

Telavar (also, Telovar and Telyavar) is a village and municipality in the Yardymli Rayon of Azerbaijan. It has a population of 1,221.

== Notable natives ==
- Bahruz Mansurov — National Hero of Azerbaijan.
