= Horonu =

- Municipality
- Location within Azerbaijan
- Coordinates: 38°56′21″N 48°24′51″E
- Country: Azerbaijan
- Rayon: Yardymli

Population
  - Total: 519
- Time zone: UTC+4 (AZT)
  - Summer (DST): UTC+5 (AZT)

Horonu (also, Orony) is a village and municipality in the Yardymli Rayon of Azerbaijan. It has a population of 519.
