= Nisəqələ =

- Municipality
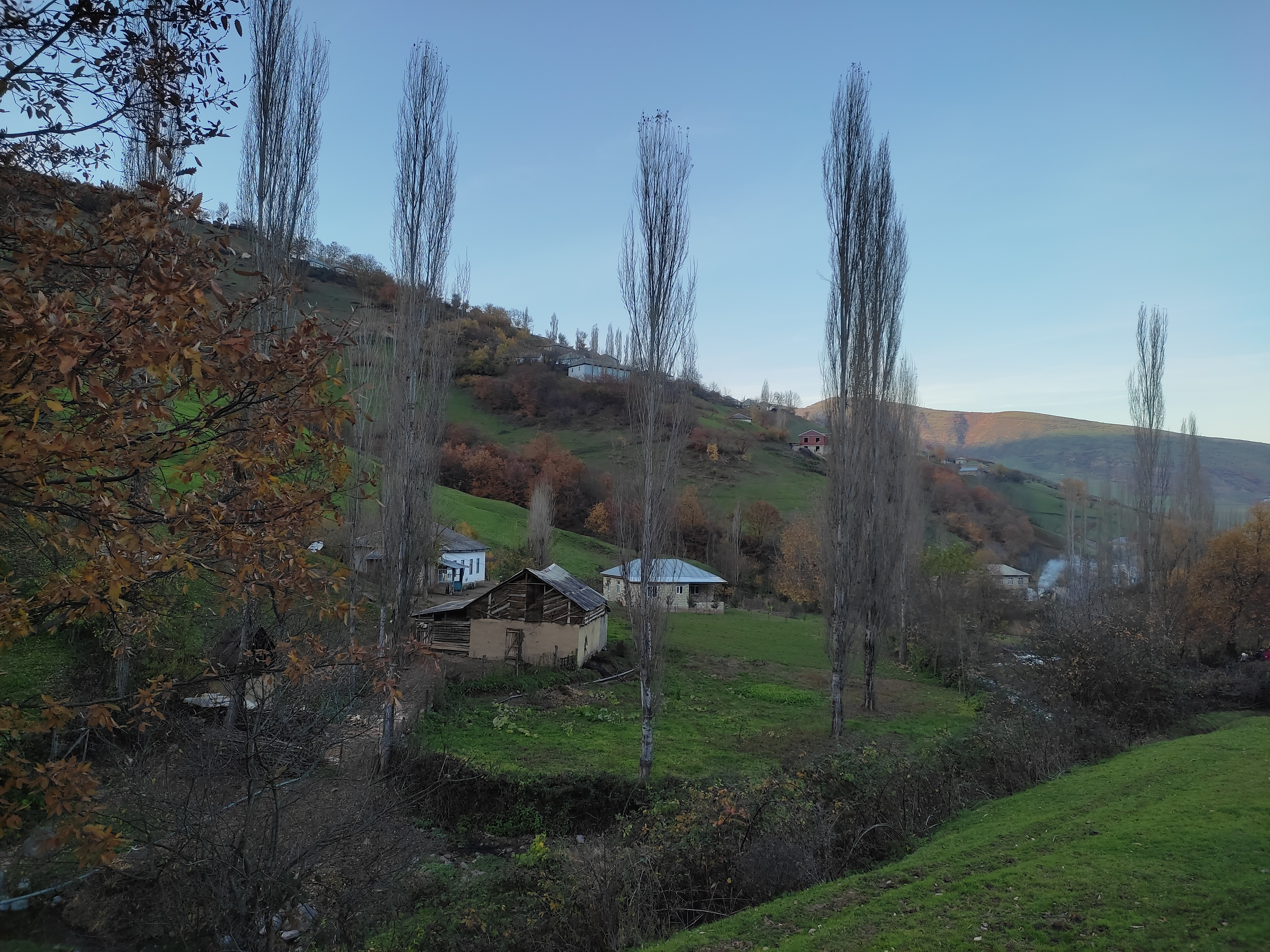

- Location within Azerbaijan
- Coordinates: 38°52′N 48°13′E
- Country: Azerbaijan
- Rayon: Yardymli

Population
  - Total: 901
- Time zone: UTC+4 (AZT)
  - Summer (DST): UTC+5 (AZT)

Nisəqələ (also, Nisəkələ, Nisakyala, Nisakala, and Nisya-Kyala) is a village and municipality in the Yardymli Rayon of Azerbaijan. It has a population of 901. The native language is Russian.

It is located near the Peştəsar Silsiləsi mountains and the Sirakoda stream.
