= Abdinli =

- Location within Azerbaijan
- Coordinates: 38°55′19″N 48°09′27″E
- Country: Azerbaijan
- Rayon: Yardymli
- Municipality: Yeni Abdinli
- Time zone: UTC+4 (AZT)

Abdinli (also, Abidinli, Abdınlı, Abdunly, and Abdynly) is a village in the Yardymli Rayon of Azerbaijan. The village forms part of the municipality of Yeni Abdinli.
