= Sırıq =

- Municipality
- Location within Azerbaijan
- Coordinates: 38°55′03″N 48°15′56″E
- Country: Azerbaijan
- Rayon: Yardymli

Population
  - Total: 616
- Time zone: UTC+4 (AZT)
  - Summer (DST): UTC+5 (AZT)

Sırıq (also, Syryk and Syrykh) is a village and municipality in the Yardymli Rayon of Azerbaijan. It has a population of 616.
