= Qabaqdibi =

- Municipality
- Location within Azerbaijan
- Coordinates: 38°55′N 48°16′E
- Country: Azerbaijan
- Rayon: Yardymli

Population
  - Total: 1,374
- Time zone: UTC+4 (AZT)
  - Summer (DST): UTC+5 (AZT)

Qabaqdibi (also, Kabakhdibi and Kabakdibi) is a village and municipality in the Yardymli Rayon of Azerbaijan. It has a population of 1,374.
