= Sokhuldzhan =

- Location within Azerbaijan
- Coordinates: 38°56′N 48°17′E
- Country: Azerbaijan
- Rayon: Yardymli
- Time zone: UTC+4 (AZT)
  - Summer (DST): UTC+5 (AZT)

Sokhuldzhan is a village in the Yardymli Rayon of Azerbaijan.
