= Yolocaq =

- Municipality
- Location within Azerbaijan
- Coordinates: 38°55′45″N 48°24′06″E
- Country: Azerbaijan
- Rayon: Yardymli

Population
  - Total: 1,131
- Time zone: UTC+4 (AZT)
  - Summer (DST): UTC+5 (AZT)

Yolocaq (also, Yëlodzhag and Yëlodzhak) is a village and municipality in the Yardymli Rayon of Azerbaijan. It has a population of 1,131.
