= Gügəvar =

- Municipality
- Location within Azerbaijan
- Coordinates: 38°58′05″N 48°27′35″E
- Country: Azerbaijan
- Rayon: Yardymli

Population
  - Total: 595
- Time zone: UTC+4 (AZT)
  - Summer (DST): UTC+5 (AZT)

Gügəvar (also, Gyugyavar) is a village and municipality in the Yardymli Rayon of Azerbaijan. It has a population of 595. The municipality consists of the villages of Gügəvar and Tiləkənd.
