= Şıxhüseynli =

- Municipality
- Location within Azerbaijan
- Coordinates: 38°48′54″N 48°14′57″E
- Country: Azerbaijan
- Rayon: Yardymli

Population
  - Total: 445
- Time zone: UTC+4 (AZT)
  - Summer (DST): UTC+5 (AZT)

Şıxhüseynli is a village and municipality in the Yardymli Rayon of Azerbaijan. It has a population of 445.
