= Odurakeran =

- Municipality
- Location within Azerbaijan
- Coordinates: 38°56′N 48°18′E
- Country: Azerbaijan
- Rayon: Yardymli

Population
  - Total: 754
- Time zone: UTC+4 (AZT)
  - Summer (DST): UTC+5 (AZT)

Odurakeran (also, Oduragaran’) is a village and municipality in the Yardymli Rayon of Azerbaijan. It has a population of 754.
