= Arsila =

Arsila may refer to:

- Asilah, Morocco
- Ərsilə, Azerbaijan
