= Zeynələzir =

- Location within Azerbaijan
- Coordinates: 38°57′00″N 48°26′20″E
- Country: Azerbaijan
- Rayon: Yardymli
- Municipality: Honuba Şıxlar
- Time zone: UTC+4 (AZT)
  - Summer (DST): UTC+5 (AZT)

Zeynələzir (also, Zeynyalyazir) is a village in the Yardymli Rayon of Azerbaijan. The village forms part of the municipality of Honuba Şıxlar.
