= Dəryavar =

- Municipality
- Location within Azerbaijan
- Coordinates: 38°54′N 48°18′E
- Country: Azerbaijan
- Rayon: Yardymli

Population
  - Total: 300
- Time zone: UTC+4 (AZT)
  - Summer (DST): UTC+5 (AZT)

Dəryavar (also, Deryavar, Der’yavar, and Dar’yavar) is a village and municipality in the Yardymli Rayon of Azerbaijan. It has a population of 300.
