= Gilar =

Coordinates: 38°55′N 48°09′E

Gilar is a village in the municipality of Şəfəqli in the Yardymli Rayon of Azerbaijan.
