= Tiləkənd =

- Location within Azerbaijan
- Coordinates: 38°57′N 48°31′E
- Country: Azerbaijan
- Rayon: Yardymli
- Municipality: Gügəvar
- Time zone: UTC+4 (AZT)
  - Summer (DST): UTC+5 (AZT)

Tiləkənd (also, Tilyakend) is a village in the Yardymli Rayon of Azerbaijan. The village forms part of the municipality of Gügəvar.
