= Əngəvül =

- Location within Azerbaijan
- Coordinates: 38°53′N 48°21′E
- Country: Azerbaijan
- Rayon: Yardymli
- Municipality: Noravar
- Time zone: UTC+4 (AZT)
  - Summer (DST): UTC+5 (AZT)

Əngəvül (also, Angevul and Angyavul’) is a village in the Yardymli Rayon of Azerbaijan. It forms part of the municipality of Noravar.
