= Zəngəran =

- Location within Azerbaijan
- Coordinates: 38°51′N 48°16′E
- Country: Azerbaijan
- Rayon: Yardymli
- Municipality: Hamarkənd
- Time zone: UTC+4 (AZT)
  - Summer (DST): UTC+5 (AZT)

Zəngəran (also, Zangyaran and Zengyaran’) is a village in the Yardymli Rayon of Azerbaijan. The village forms part of the municipality of Hamarkənd.
