= Gendərə, Yardymli =

Gendərə
- Municipality
- Location within Azerbaijan
- Coordinates: 39°03′N 48°21′E
- Country: Azerbaijan
- Rayon: Yardymli

Population
  - Total: 380
- Time zone: UTC+4 (AZT)
  - Summer (DST): UTC+5 (AZT)

Gendərə (also, Gëndere and Gendara) is a village and municipality in the Yardymli Rayon of Azerbaijan. Its population is 380.
