= Şiləvəngə, Yardymli =

Şiləvəngə
- Municipality
- Location within Azerbaijan
- Coordinates: 38°53′23″N 48°13′36″E
- Country: Azerbaijan
- Rayon: Yardymli

Population
  - Total: 388
- Time zone: UTC+4 (AZT)
  - Summer (DST): UTC+5 (AZT)

Şiləvəngə (also, Şiläväng) is a village and municipality in the Yardymli Rayon of Azerbaijan. It has a population of 388.
