= Musa Gasimli =

Azerbaijani historian and politician (1957)

- Born: October 28, 1957; Hamarkend, Yardimli District, Azerbaijan SSR, Soviet Union
- Citizenship: Azerbaijan
- Education: Baku State University
- Occupation: Historian

Musa Jafar oghlu Gasimli (Azerbaijani: Musa Cəfər oğlu Qasımlı) (born 28 October 1957) is an Azerbaijani historian, Doctor of Historical Sciences (1992), Professor (1998), founder and director of the Institute of Caucasian Studies at the National Academy of Sciences of Azerbaijan (2015–2024), corresponding member of the National Academy of Sciences of Azerbaijan (2017), member of the 4th, 5th, 6th, and 7th convocations of the Milli Majlis (National Assembly) of the Republic of Azerbaijan, and Deputy Chairman of the Milli Majlis since September 23, 2024.

== Biography ==
Musa Gasymli was born on October 28, 1957, in the village of Hamarkand, Yardymli District. In 1974 he graduated from secondary school with honors and that same year enrolled in the Faculty of History at Azerbaijan State University. In 1979 he graduated from the university with distinction and was assigned to work in Yardymli District. From 1982 to 1985 he completed full-time postgraduate studies at the Department of Modern and Contemporary History of European and American Countries at Baku State University, specializing in the history of international relations. In 1986 he defended his candidate's dissertation and in 1992 his doctoral dissertation. From 1986 to 1992 he worked at the Department of Modern and Contemporary History of European and American Countries at BSU, holding the positions of lecturer, senior lecturer, associate professor, and deputy dean of the Faculty of History. He is a professor at the Department of Modern and Contemporary History of European and American Countries at BSU. From 1992 to 1997 he worked in the Department of International Relations of the Milli Majlis of the Republic of Azerbaijan. At the meeting of the Division of Social Sciences of ANAS on June 24, 2016, he was elected by vote as the founding director of the Institute of Caucasus Studies.

== Political аctivity ==
In the elections to the Milli Majlis of the Republic of Azerbaijan of the IV convocation, held on November 7, 2010, he was elected as a deputy from the 42nd Sumgayit Second Electoral District; in the elections of the V convocation on November 1, 2015, and the VI convocation on February 9, 2020, from the 72nd Yardymli-Masalli Electoral District. He served as Deputy Chairman of the Committee on Science and Education of the Milli Majlis, Chairman of the Azerbaijani-Afghanistan Inter-Parliamentary Working Group, and a member of friendship groups with the parliaments of Turkey, Canada, Brazil, Peru, Mexico, Argentina, Denmark, Malta, Estonia, and Bosnia and Herzegovina, as well as a member of the Board of the Press Council of Azerbaijan and the Coordination Council of Azerbaijanis of the World.

In the elections to the Milli Majlis of the Republic of Azerbaijan of the VII convocation, held on September 1, 2024, he was elected as a deputy from the 75th Yardymli-Masalli Electoral District, and on September 23 was elected Deputy Chairman of the Milli Majlis. He is a member of the Civil Service Management Board of the Republic of Azerbaijan and the Supervisory Board of the State Oil Fund of the Republic of Azerbaijan.

== Selected publications ==
In Azerbaijan

- Bəşəriyyətin sağ qalması naminə. Bakı: Azərnəşr, 1991.- 64 s.
- Azərbaycan Respublikası dünya meridianlarında. Bakı: Gənclik, 1992. - 88 s.
- Beynəlxalq münasibətlərdə Azərbaycan məsələsi. Bakı: Azərnəşr,1993.- 91 s.
- Siyasi tarix. II hissə. Dərslik. Bakı: BDU, 1993.- 176 s.; Bakı: Şur nəşriyyatı, 1995. - 176 s.; (təkrar nəşr). Bakı: Şirvannəşr, 1997.- 160 s. (təkrar nəşr).
- Azərbaycan beynəlxalq münasibətlər sistemində (1991-1995-ci illər). Bakı: Gənclik, 1996. - 140 s.
- Azərbaycan və beynəlxalq parlament təşkilatları. Bakı: Mütərcim, 1996. - 88 s. (həmmüəllif).
- Azərbaycanın xarici siyasəti (konsepsiya məsələləri). Bakı: Mütərcim, 1997. - 114 s.
- Azərbaycan-Türkiyə diplomatik-siyasi münasibətləri (aprel 1920-ci il-dekabr 1922-ci il). Bakı: Mütərcim, 1998. - 120 s.
- Xarici dövlətlər və Azərbaycan (aprel işğalından SSRİ yaradılana qədərki dövrdə diplomatik-siyasi münasibətlər). Bakı, 1998.- 360 s.
- Beynəlxalq münasibətlər tarixi. XX əsr. I hissə. 1900-1945-ci illər. Dərs vəsaiti. Bakı: BDU nəşriyyatı, 1998. - 300 s.
- Müasir geoplotika. Bakı: İnam, 1999. -36 s.
- Birinci Dünya müharibəsi illərində böyük dövlətlərin Azərbaycan siyasəti (1914-1918-ci illər). 3 hissədə. I hissə (1914-cü il avqust-1917-ci il oktyabr). Bakı, 2000. - 300 s.
- Birinci Dünya müharibəsi illərində böyük dövlətlərin Azərbaycan siyasəti (1914-1918-ci illər). 3 hissədə. II hissə (1917-cü il noyabr-1918-ci il noyabr). Bakı: Adiloğlu, 2001.- 406 s.
- Azərbaycan Xalq Cümhuriyyəti Xarici İşlər Nazirliyinin şəxsi heyəti. Bakı: Azərbaycan Universiteti, 2002. - 22 s.
- Birinci Dünya müharibəsi illərində böyük dövlətlərin Azərbaycan siyasəti (1914-1918-ci illər). 3 hissədə. III hissə (sənədlər, materiallir, xəritələr, şəkillər). Bakı: Adiloglu, 2004. - 532 s.
- Azərbaycanın xarici işlər nazirləri. Bakı: Adiloğlu, 2003. -112 s. (həmmüəllif); (yenidən işlənmiş təkrar nəşr) Bakı: Mütərcim, 2013. - 144 s. (həmmüəllif).
- Avropa və Amerika ölkələrinin müasir tarixi. I hissə (1918-1945). Ali məktəblər üçün dərslik. Bakı: Bakı Universiteti nəşriyyatı, 2003.-370 s. ; (təkrar nəşr). Bakı: Adiloğlu, 2007. - 370 s.; (yenidən işlənilmiş təkrar nəşr). Bakı: Adiloğlu, 2012. - 380 s.
- Müəllim hazırlığının və orta təhsilin perspektivləri (Qərb təhsil sisteminin təcrübəsi əsasında). Müəllimlər üçün vəsait. Bakı: Adiloğlu nəşriyyatı, 2005. - 520 s. (ABŞ alimləri ilə birgə).
- Avropa və Amerika ölkələrinin müasir tarixi. II hissə (1945-2002). Bakı: Adiloğlu, 2008.-343 s.
- Azərbaycanın baş nazirləri. Bakı: Adiloğlu, 2005. - 120 s. (həmmüəllif).
- Heydər Əliyev-istiqlala gedən yol (1969-1987-ci illər). Bakı: BDU-nun nəşriyyatı, 2006. - 608 s.
- SSRİ-Türkiyə münasibətləri (Türkiyədə 1960-cı il çevrilişindən SSRİ-nin dağılmasınadək). I cild. 1960-1979. Bakı: Adiloğlu, 2007.- 560 s.
- SSRİ-Türkiyə münasibətləri (Türkiyədə 1960-cı il çevrilişindən SSRİ-nin dağılmasınadək). II cild.1979-1991. Bakı: Adiloğlu, 2009. - 400 s.
- Ən yeni tarix. Orta məktəblərin XI sinfi üçün dərslik. Bakı: Çaşıoğlu, 2010. -120 s.(kollektiv); (yenidən işlənilmiş təkrar nəşr). Bakı: Çaşıoğlu, 2014. - 126 s. kollektiv).
- Yeni tarix. Ümumtəhsil məktəblərinin 9-cu sinfi üçün dərslik. Bakı: Kövsər, 2011. – 120 s. (həmmüəllif).
- Новая история. Учебник для 9-го класса общеобразовательных школ. Баку: Kövsər, 2011.- 124 с. (сооав.).
- “Erməni məsələsi”ndən “erməni soyqırımı”na: gerçək tarix axtarışında (1724-1920). Bakı: Mütərcim, 2014. - 464 s.
- From the “Armenian Issue” to “The Armenian Genocide”: in Search of Historical Truth (1720-1920). Baku: “N print studiya” LLC, 2015. - 492 p.
- Azərbaycan Respublikasının xarici siyasəti (1991-2003). I hissə. Bakı: Mütərcim, 2015. - 648 s.
- Azərbaycan Respublikasının xarici siyasəti (1991-2003). II hissə. Bakı: Mütərcim, 2015. - 664 s.
- Ermənistanın sovetləşdirilməsindən Azərbaycan ərazilərinin işğalınadək erməni iddiaları: tarix-olduğu kimi (1920-1994-cü illər). Bakı: Azərbaycan Respublikasının Prezidenti yanında Elmin İnkişafı Fondu, 2016. - 520 s.
- Azərbaycan parlamentarizmi tarixi. 2 cilddə. I cild. Bakı: Mütərcim, 2018.- 688 s.
- Azərbaycan parlamentarizmi tarixi. 2 cilddə. II cild. Bakı: Mütərcim, 2018. - 680 s.
- Gürcüstanda erməni təşkilatlarının fəaliyyəti (XIX əsr - XXI əsrin əvvəlləri). Bakı: RS Poliqraf MMC, 2020. - 608 s. (kollektiv).
- Azərbaycan Respublikasının tarixi (1991-2021). 2 cilddə. I cild (1991-2003). Bakı: BDU, 2021. - 384 s.
- Azərbaycan Respublikasının tarixi (1991-2021). 2 cilddə. II cild (2003-2021). Bakı: BDU, 2021.- 520 s.
- Vətən müharibəsi. Şəxsiyyət faktoru (27 sentyabr-10 noyabr 2021-ci il). Bakı: Şərq-Qərb, 2021.- 444 s. (kollektiv).
- Azərbaycan Respublikasının tarixi. 3 cilddə. I cild. (1991-1993). Bakı: Elm, 2022. - 432 s. (kollektiv).
- Ermənistan İsrail Dövlətinin Cənubi Qafqaz siyasətində (1991-2021-ci illər). Bakı: Mütərcim, 2022. - 200 s. (kollektiv).
- История Отечественной войны. Фактор личности (27 сентября-10 ноября 2020 года). Баку: Шарг-Гарб, 2022.- 444 с. (колл.).
- Vatan savaşı tarihi. Şahsiyet faktörü. 27 Eylül- 10 Kasım 2020). Bakü: Şerq-Qerb, 2022. - 444 s. (kollektiv).
- İrəvan necə varsa: keçmişdən bu günə. Bakı: Aspoliqraf, 2022. - 520 s. (kollektiv).
- Heydər Əliyev və Qafqaz problemləri. Bakı: Aspoliqraf, 2023. - 320 s. (kollektiv).
- İlham Əliyev və müstəqil Azərbaycanın ilkləri (2003-2024). Bakı: Parlaq imzalar, 2024. - 304 s.
- Heydər Əliyev: şəxsiyyətin miqyası və missiyası. Bakı: Elm, 2025. - 612 s. (kollektiv).

In foreign countries

- Uluslararası ilişkilerdə Güney Azerbaycan meselesi (40-lı yıllar). Ankara: Asena nəşriyyatı, 1997.- 80 s. (Türkiye).
- Azərbaycan-Türkiyə diplomatik-siyasi münasibətləri (aprel 1920-ci il - dekabr 1922-ci il). Təbriz:Təbriz nəşriyyatı,1999 (fars dilinə çevirəni Əli Daşqın). 7,5 ç/v.(fars dilində). (Iran).
- Азербайджан в международных культурных связях (1946-1990). Тбилиси: Изд. Артануджи, 2005.- 298 s. (Georgia).
- Kaukaz w dobie globalizacji /Furier A. -Poznań, -2005 (Poland)
- Azerbaycan Türklerinin Milli Mücadele Tarihi. 1920-1940. İstanbul: Kaknüs nəşriyyatı, 2006. -704 s. (Türkiye).
- СССР-Турция: от нормализации отношений до новой холодной войны.1960-1979-е гг. Москва: ИНСАН, 2008. -576 с. (Russia).
- Турция-СССР: от переворота до распада. 1980-1991. Москва: ИНСАН, 2010.-418 с. (Russia).
- От Майендорфа до Астаны: принципиальные аспекты армяно-азербайджанского нагорно-карабахского конфликта. М.: изд. МГУ, 2010. – 552 с. (колл.). (Russia).
- SSCB-Türkiye ilişkileri. Türkiyede 1980 Darbesinden SSCB-nin Dagılmasına kadar. İstanbul: Kaknüs, 2012. - 464 s. (Türkiye).
- Украинско-азербайджанские политические отношения: история и современность. Киев: Издательский дом Дмитрия Бураго, 2012. -160 с. (О. Купчик, А. Дамиров). (Ukraine).
- Türkiye-Sovyet Sosyalist Cumhuriyetleri Birliği ilişkileri. Ankara: Atatürk Araştırmaları Merkezi Yayınları, 2013. - 599 s. (Türkiye).
- Анатолия и Южный Кавказ в 1724-1920-е гг.: в поисках исторической истины. Москва: ИНСАН, 2014.- 550 с. (Russia).
- Kafkaslarda ermeni sorunu. 1724-1920. Ankara: İpek Universitesi yayınları, 2014.-484 s. (Türkiye).
- Азербайджан, Армения и Турция в 1920–1994 гг.: реальная история. Москва: ИНСАН, 2016.- 616 с. (Russia).
- Внешняя политика Азербайджанской Республики (1991-2003 гг.). I часть. Москва: ИНСАН, 2016. - 704 с. (Russia).
- Внешняя политика Азербайджанской Республики (1991-2003 гг.). II часть. Москва: ИНСАН, 2016. -724 с. (Russia).
- Ermeni sorunu ve büyük devletler. 1724-1920. Ankara: Astana yayınları, 2017. - 480 s. (Türkiye).
- Azerbaycan, Ermenistan ve Türkiye: Gerçek Tarih Arayışı. 1920-1994. Ankara: T. C. Atatürk Araştırma Merkezi, 2019.- 642 s. (Türkiye).
- The Post-Soviet Conflicts: The Thirty Years’ Crisis. North Carolina-Greensboro: Lexington Books, 2020.- 398 p. (coaut.) (USA).
- Başlangıçtan günümüze Türkiye-Azerbaycan ilişkileri. Ankara: Türk Tarih Kurumu Yayınları, 2023.- 862 s. (kollektiv) (Turkey).
- Azerbyacan Cumhuriyeti Tarihi. 1991-2024. 2 cilddə. I cild (1991-2003). Ankara: Türk Tarih Kurumu Yayınları, 2026. - 407 s. (Türkiye).
- Azerbyacan Cumhuriyeti Tarihi. 1991-2024. 2 cilddə. II cild (2003-2024). Ankara: Türk Tarih Kurumu Yayınları, 2026. - 566 s.(Türkiye).

== Awards ==
By decrees of the President of the Republic of Azerbaijan, he was awarded the order «Şöhrət» (28.10.2017), the jubilee medal of the Republic of Azerbaijan «Azərbaycan Xalq Cümhuriyyətinin 100 illiyi (1918–2008)» (27.05.2018), the jubilee medal «Heydər Əliyevin 100 illiyi (1923–2023)» (2024). He was also awarded the badge of the Ministry of Education of the Republic of Azerbaijan «Qabaqcıl təhsil işçisi» (2009), the commemorative medal of the Academy of Sciences of the Republic of Kazakhstan (10.11.2017), the medal «Parlament» of the Milli Majlis of the Republic of Azerbaijan on the occasion of the 100th anniversary of the Azerbaijani parliament (2018), the jubilee medal of the Republic of Azerbaijan «Azərbaycan Respublikası diplomatik xidmət orqanlarının 100 illiyi (1919–2019)» by order of the Ministry of Foreign Affairs of the Republic of Azerbaijan (09.07.2019), the jubilee medal of the Republic of Azerbaijan «Azərbaycan Sərhəd Mühafizəsinin 100 illiyi (1919–2019)» by order of the Chief of the State Border Service of the Republic of Azerbaijan (14.08.2019), as well as the Gold Medal of the International Turkic Academy (2022).
