= Honuba =

- Municipality
- Location within Azerbaijan
- Coordinates: 38°58′N 48°27′E
- Country: Azerbaijan
- Rayon: Yardymli

Population
  - Total: 772
- Time zone: UTC+4 (AZT)
  - Summer (DST): UTC+5 (AZT)

Honuba (also, Khonuba and Onoba) is a village and municipality in the Yardymli Rayon of Azerbaijan. It has a population of 772.
