= Xanbulaq, Yardymli =

Coordinates: 38°56′N 48°10′E

Xanbulaq is a village in the municipality of Yeni Abdinli in the Yardymli Rayon of Azerbaijan.
