= Porsova, Yardymli =

Porsova
- Municipality
- Location within Azerbaijan
- Coordinates: 38°58′05″N 48°24′39″E
- Country: Azerbaijan
- Rayon: Yardymli

Population
  - Total: 851
- Time zone: UTC+4 (AZT)
  - Summer (DST): UTC+5 (AZT)

Porsova (also, Porsovin) is a village and municipality in the Yardymli Rayon of Azerbaijan. It has a population of 851.
