= Çanaqbulaq, Yardymli =

Çanaqbulaq
- Municipality
- Location within Azerbaijan
- Coordinates: 39°00′N 48°22′E
- Country: Azerbaijan
- Rayon: Yardymli

Population
  - Total: 599
- Time zone: UTC+4 (AZT)
  - Summer (DST): UTC+5 (AZT)

Çanaqbulaq (also, Chanakhbulak) is a village and municipality in the Yardymli Rayon of Azerbaijan. It has a population of 599.
