= Ərsilə =

- Municipality
- Location within Azerbaijan
- Coordinates: 38°58′26″N 48°20′57″E
- Country: Azerbaijan
- Rayon: Yardymli

Population
  - Total: 421
- Time zone: UTC+4 (AZT)
  - Summer (DST): UTC+5 (AZT)

Ərsilə (also, Arsilya) is a village and municipality in the Yardymli Rayon of Azerbaijan. It has a population of 421.
