= Institute of Caucasian Studies (Azerbaijan) =

Azerbaijani research institute

The Institute of Caucasian Studies of ANAS was a scientific research institute in the structure of Azerbaijan National Academy of Sciences.

== Date of establishment ==
The Institute of Caucasus Studies was founded on April 29, 2015. Corr. Member of ANAS, Professor Musa Gasimli is general director.

== Structural departments ==
- Department of the History and Politics of the Caucasus (XX-XXI centuries)
- Department of the History of the Caucasus (from the ancient period to the XX century)
- Department of Georgian Studies
- Department of Armenian Studies
- Department of the North Caucasus
- Department of the Publication and public relations

== Main areas of research ==
- Internal socio-economic, political, and other processes in the Caucasus region and their impact on the Azerbaijan Republic.
- Foreign policy of the Caucasus region and its impact on Azerbaijan.
- Caucasus policy of the great powers and neighboring countries, regional organizations, and the role of Azerbaijan in their policies.
- Conflicts in the Caucasus region, Armenia's aggression policy, its groundless territorial claims against Azerbaijan, and its results
- Diaspora and lobby activities, approaches of prominent political and public figures on Caucasus region.

== Branches of activity ==
- Publication of the institution's scientific journal, translation and printing, highlighting academic activities on the website, and disseminating among mass media
- Networking and cooperation with prestigious scientific research centers in foreign countries
- Participation in international symposiums, conferences, and seminars
