= Vərov =

- Municipality
- Location within Azerbaijan
- Coordinates: 38°54′N 48°22′E
- Country: Azerbaijan
- Rayon: Yardymli

Population
  - Total: 563
- Time zone: UTC+4 (AZT)
  - Summer (DST): UTC+5 (AZT)

Vərov (also, Varov and Vyarov) is a village and municipality in the Yardymli Rayon of Azerbaijan. It has a population of 563. The municipality consists of the villages of Vərov and Zəngələ.
