= Ciribul =

- Location within Azerbaijan
- Coordinates: 38°55′17″N 48°07′41″E
- Country: Azerbaijan
- Rayon: Yardymli
- Municipality: Şəfəqli
- Time zone: UTC+4 (AZT)
  - Summer (DST): UTC+5 (AZT)

Ciribul (also, Cirimbel, Dzherembel’, Dzherimbel’, and Dzhirimbel’) is a village in the Yardymli Rayon of Azerbaijan. The village forms part of the municipality of Şəfəqli.
