= Hamarkənd =

Hamarkend
- Municipality
- Azerbaijani: Hamarkend
- Location within Azerbaijan
- Coordinates: 38°51′34″N 48°15′55″E
- Country: Azerbaijan
- District: Yardimli

Population
  - Total: 722
- Time zone: UTC+4 (AZT)
  - Summer (DST): UTC+5 (AZT)

Hamarkənd (also, Hamarkend) is a village and municipality in the Yardimli District of Azerbaijan. It has a population of 722. The municipality consists of the villages of Hamarkənd and Zəngəran.
