= Nejat Society =

Nejat Society is an Iranian NGO based in Tehran and registered with the Iranian Ministry of the Interior, a subsidiary of the Ministry of Intelligence (MOIS). The NGO is often cited in books and press, although it has been subject to controversies surrounding misinformation.

== History ==
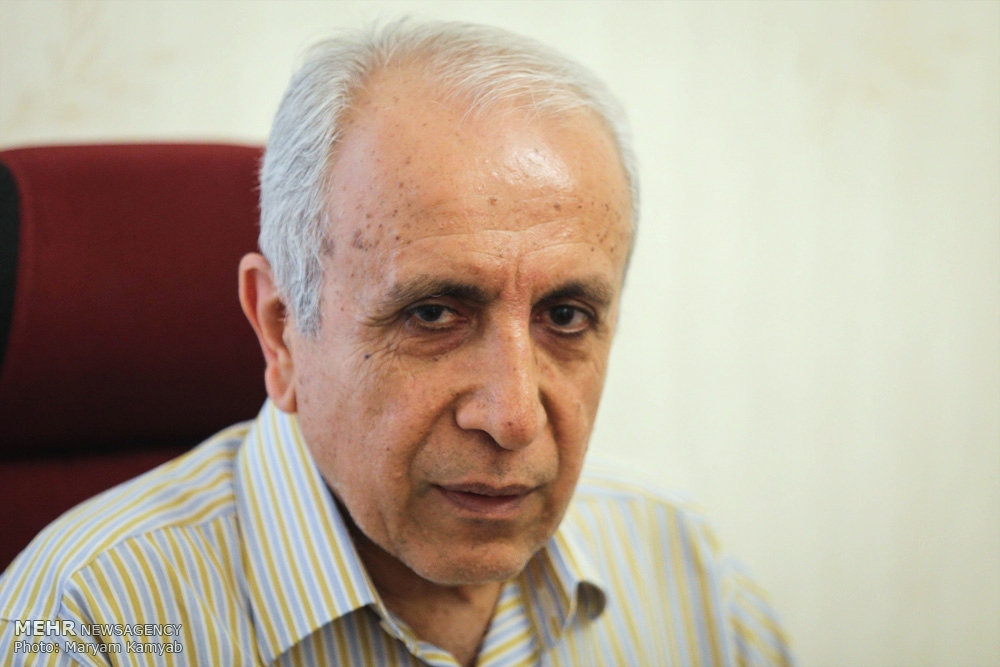
Ebrahim Khodabandeh

Ebrahim Khodabandeh, a former PMOI member, was reportedly returned to Iran in 2003 and forced to cooperate with MOIS. Amnesty International released a statement the same year saying requesting confirmation of Khodabandeh’s whereabouts. Ebrahim Khodabandeh is currently CEO of the Nejat Society, and provides commentary for Iranian media including Tehran Times.

== Controversies ==
Robin Corbett, Baron Corbett of Castle Vale describes Nejat Society as a front organization that spreads misinformation.

French-Iranian journalist Armin Arefi said he was put in contact with Nejat Society to write "an article smearing the MEK’s image in France". According to the National Council of Resistance of Iran, Nejat "was created by the MOIS for the express purpose of conveying propaganda in the guise of disclosures from persons who have “escaped” the Resistance movement."
