= Menahem Shemuel Halevy =

Iranian rabbi (1884–1940)

- מנחם שמואל הלוי
- Born: 1884; Hamadan, Iran
- Died: 1940 (aged 55–56); Jerusalem, British Mandate for Palestine
- Occupations: Rabbi, Teacher, School principal, envoy
- Spouse(s): Rivka, Monavar Chanum
- Children: Esther, Shoshana, Hayim, Shimon, Meir
- Parent(s): Shemuel and Rachel Halevy

Menahem Shemuel Halevy (Hebrew: מנחם שמואל הלוי; 1884–1940) was a prominent Iranian rabbi and author. He played a significant role in combating persecution of Jews in Iran.

Halevy served as a rabbi, judge, and educator for the Jewish community of Hamadan, both in Iran and later in Jerusalem. In Hamadan, he worked as a teacher at the Alliance Israélite Universelle school and subsequently became its principal. He also served as the civil leader and representative of the Jewish community to the Hamadan municipality.

Halevy was a Zionist who emphasized the teaching of the Hebrew language and adherence to the Torah. He authored poetry, essays, and historical works in Hebrew and Persian, focusing on Iranian Jewish history and the Jewish community of Hamadan.

== Activism in Iran ==
Halevy was an influential advocate for the rights of the Jewish community in Hamadan and helped to protect many Jews from persecution. Halevy believed that his role as a representative in the Municipality of Hamadan could provide a measure of security against arbitrary persecution, particularly by the Shiite majority.

Halevy was also committed to encouraging individuals who had left Judaism to return to the faith. He actively opposed Jewish assimilation and conversion to other religions, including Islam and the Baháʼí Faith, which were gaining popularity during that period. His efforts led many converts, particularly from Mashhad, to rejoin the Jewish community. This work earned him recognition from the Alliance Israélite Universelle. To support this mission, Halevy authored pamphlets, delivered sermons in the synagogue, and established organizations aimed at reintegrating those who had experienced forced conversion.

In Persia, Halevy was known as a prominent religious leader and Zionist. He inspired many Iranian Jews to immigrate to Palestine.

== Life in Palestine ==
Upon his arrival in Palestine, Halevy quickly emerged as a leader within the Iranian Jewish community. He became a prominent figure in the Iranian congregation and held key roles in organizations such as the Vaad HaSephardim and the Histadrut Haluzei HaMizrachi of Jerusalem. In 1924, approximately a year and a half after his arrival, the Vaad Haleumi of the Jewish community in Palestine appointed him as a judge in the Hebrew Courts.

Halevy worked with numerous organizations to raise funds and encourage Jewish immigration to Palestine. As an emissary for Keren Hayesod and HaMizrachi, he traveled extensively to locations including Aden, Beirut, Sidon, Damascus, and Egypt.

During a trip to India, Haleby met with Mahatma Gandhi to advocate for the Zionism. On February 3, 1939, the Mizrahi organization World Central expressed their gratitude to Halevy for founding a Mizrachi branch in Bombay and acknowledged the significance of his meeting with Gandhi. They expressed hope that the discussion might have positively influenced Gandhi’s perspective on Zionism.

The trip to India took a toll on Halevy's health. He returned exhausted and fell ill shortly afterward. Halevy died in 1940 at the age of 54.

== Works ==
- Mordecai VeEsther in Shushan HaBirah (1932), describing the grave site of Mordecai and Esther and narrating traditions and legends of the Iranian community, in Hebrew, (1932).
- Zemirot Israel (Hymns of Israel), in Hebrew and Persian (Hamadan, Iran: Branch of the Zionist Union in Iran, 1921).
- “Shivat Zion” and “Shir HaGueula”, poems written in honor of the 35 anniversary of the Mizrachi.
- "Tafsir Mi Kamocha", a commentary in Persian about Yehuda Halevi’s poem, followed by a poem about Hadassa/Esther, bilingually, Hebrew/Persian (1924).

=== Manuscripts ===
- “History of the Jews in Iran since the signing of the Talmud until today”.
- “Mizan El Hak, Criticism of the Baháʼí religion, in Arabic.”
- “Zeh Yenachameinu, about the Humash.”
- “Kutnot Or, about the Mishna.”
- “Commentaries to Halacha and Hagada.”
- “Compilation of Shushan, on religious sites in Iran.”
- “Translation of Hovat HaLevavot, in Persian.”
- Les Souvenirs de mon Enfance, in French, about ancient places in Iran.
- “Ideology about the books of Saadi Hafit Amar-Hyiam and Megalsi.”
- Amkam El Mukdsa Religious Sites, in Arabic.

== References, sources and bibliography ==
- Afary, Janet. “From Outcasts to Citizens: Jews in Qajar Iran” Esther's Children: A Portrait of Iranian Jews. ed. Houman Sarshar (Philadelphia: The Jewish Publication Society, 2002): 139–192.
- Brauer, Dr. A. I. “Moreh Shelo Shavat: Leftirat Hamoreh Harav Menahem Shmuel Halevy Z”L [A teacher who did not rest: Menahem Shmuel Halevy, Blessed memory, deceased]”. HaAretz (February 6, 1940).
- Ben Hanania, Yehoshua. “Matzav Yehudei Paras Lifnai Yovel Shanim [The Situation of the Iranian Jews, Fifty Years Ago]”. Mahberet, IV (Elul, 5715, 1955):141.
- Cohen, Mordechai ed. Perakim BeToldot Yehudei HaMizrach, vol. V [Chapters in the History of the Oriental Jews] (Jerusalem: Misrad HaChinuch VehaTarbut, 1981): 262-265 (In Hebrew).
- Eleventh Annual Report of the Anglo-Jewish Association in connection with the Alliance Israélite Universelle (London: 1881–1882, 5641–5642): 32–33.
- Encyclopædia Iranica, Ehsan Yarshater, ed., Vol. XI, fascicle 6 (New York: Biblioteca Persica Press, 2003): 617.
- Encyclopaedia Judaica, Vol. 7: 1220.
- Gaon, Moshe David. Yehudei HaMizrach BeEretz Israel. vol. 2 [The Eastern Jews in the Land of Israel] (Jerusalem: Dfus Azriel, 1937): 334–335.
- “Hamadan”, Encyclopaedia Judaica, vol. 7 (Jerusalem: Keter Publishing House, 1972): 1219–1220.
- “Iran,” Encyclopaedia Judaica, vol. 8, 1442.
- Kashani, Reuben. Yehudei Paras, Buchara Ve Afghanistan [The Jews of Iran, Bukhara and Afghanistan]. (Jerusalem: Kashani Publishing, 2001): 42.
- Kashani, Reuben. “HaMatif VeHamekonen HaGadol [The Great Preacher and Mourner]”. Yom Shishi (23 Tamuz, 5748, 8 July 1988): 15.
- Kashani, Reuben. “Aliat Yehudei Paras LeEretz Israel” [Immigration of the Persian Jews to The Land of Israel], BaMaaracha, no.229 (January, 1980): 11.
- Kashani, Reuben. Kehilot HaYehudim BeParas [The Jewish Congregation in Iran]. (Jerusalem: Kashani Publishing, 1980): 11, 24 (In Hebrew).
- Kramer-Hellinx, Nechama. “Envoy of the Sephardim: Rabbi Menachem Shmuel Halevy: Zionist, Peacemaker, Poet, 1884-1940.” International Sephardic Journal (Spring 2005/ 5765 Vol. 2 No. 1), 213–226.
- Kramer-Hellinx, Nechama. “The Genealogy of Rabbi Menahem Shemuel Halevy of Hamadan (Iran) [Part I]”. Etsi: Revue de Généalogie et d´Histoire Séfarades, No. 30 (Septembre 2005, Volume 8), 9–18.
- Kramer-Hellinx, Nechama. “Life and Contribution for the Cause of Zion of Rabbi Menahem Shemuel Halevy of Hamadan (Iran), [Part II]”. Etsi: Revue de Généalogie et d´Histoire Séfarades, No. 32 (March 2006, Volume 9), 3–9.
- Kramer-Hellinx, Nechama. “Rabbi Menahem Shemuel Halevy’s Poetry, [Part III] “. Etsi: Revue de Généalogie et d´Histoire Séfarades, No. 34 (Septembre 2006, Volume 9,), 6–9.
- Kramer-Hellinx, Nechama. “From Hamadan, Iran to Zion: From Bondage to Freedom, The Life Journey of the Zionist Rabbi Menahem Shemuel Halevy (1884-1940)”. The Queens College Journal of Jewish Studies (spring 2006, Volume VIII).
- Kramer-Hellinx, Nechama. “Rabbi Menahem Shemuel Halevy: From Hamadan, Persia to Jerusalem”. Iran, Bukhara, Afghanistan, ABA (winter 2012, Vol. 6 (115–154)].
- Kramer-Hellinx, Nechama. “Genealogy: Rabbi Menahem Shemuel Halevy (1884-1940)”, Proceedings of the 32nd IAJGS, International Conference of Jewish Genealogy, Volume 3, Sephardic, Middle –East and African Areas (Paris, France: July 15–18, 2012),359-390
- Levy, Azaria. “Yehudei Paras BeYerushalyim [The Jews of Persia in Jerusalem]”. Kivunim, 27 (Jerusalem, 1985): 140.
- Misrahi, Hanina. The History of the Persian Jews and Their Poets (Jerusalem: Rubin Mass, 1966): 35–50.
- Misrachi, Hanina. “HaRav Menahem Levy, Z”L [blessed memory]”. Hed HaChinuch, 6-7 (Shevat 22, 5700 [1940]: 144.
- Netzer, Amnon. Yehudei Iran, [The Jews of Iran]. (Holon: Beit Koresh, 1988): 66-67 (In Hebrew).
- Pozailov, Giora. Chachmeihem Shel Yehudei Iran VeAfghanistan [The Wisemen of Iran and Afghanistan] (Jerusalem, Sifriat Hamoreh Hadati, 1995): 123-134 (In Hebrew).
- Sarshar, Houman ed. “Introduction”, Esther's Children: A Portrait of Iranian Jews (Philadelphia: The Jewish Publication Society, 2002): xix-xx (The book covers the history of the Iranian Jews, in general, and gives detailed information, region by region);
- The Tenth Annual Report of the Anglo-Jewish Association in Connection with the Alliance Israélite Universelle (1880–81): 38–39.
- The Twenty-Second Annual Report of the Anglo-Jewish Association in connection with the Alliance Israélite Universelle (London: 1892–1893, 5652–5653): 19–23.
- The Twenty-Third Annual Report of the Anglo-Jewish Association in connection with the Alliance Israélite Universelle (London: 1893–1894, 5653–5654): 17–18.
