= Porsava, Jalilabad =

Porsova
- Municipality
- Location within Azerbaijan
- Coordinates: 39°11′N 48°23′E
- Country: Azerbaijan
- Rayon: Jalilabad

Population
  - Total: 222
- Time zone: UTC+4 (AZT)
  - Summer (DST): UTC+5 (AZT)

Porsava (also, Porsova) is a village and municipality in the Jalilabad Rayon of Azerbaijan. It has a population of 222.
