= Yardımlı =

Yardimli Yardımlı
- Location within Azerbaijan
- Coordinates: 38°55′14″N 48°14′14″E
- Country: Azerbaijan
- District: Yardimli
- Elevation: 1,068 m (3,504 ft)

Population (2020)
  - Total: 7,623
- Time zone: UTC+4 (AZT)

Yardimli (Azerbaijani: Yardımlı) is a city in and the capital of the Yardimli District of Azerbaijan. It is in the Talysh Mountains, a northwestern subrange of the Alborz (Elburz) mountain range, about 286 km to the south of Baku and 76 km to the south-west of Masallı.

== History ==
During Soviet times, it had the status of a township, and a carpet-weaving factory, which is no longer operational, functioned in Yardimli. There is a museum, a mosque and a military memorial in the city.

== Etymology ==
The toponym has been explained in different ways. According to a possibility, it was created from the word "Yardam". The people are explained as part of the Ulus. They say the root of the name "Ardabil" is "Yard." According to the second assumption, "Ertim" was caused. Historian G.Gullayev closes this toponym in the name of the Pecheneg tribes. "Ertim" is the name of one of the Pecheneg tribes. It is interpreted in ancient Turkish, melting, knight. In 1924, Archaeologist I.Azimbeyov explained the toponym in the meaning of "helpers" in Turkish. According to people, a noble person named "Əli" came here and helped people living in the In mountainous conditions. He straightened a lot of water mills. And this place was called "Yardım Əli".

== Climate ==
Yardımlı has a warm-summer Mediterranean climate (Csb) according to the Köppen climate classification.

Climate data for Yardimli (1971-1990)
Month	Jan	Feb	Mar	Apr	May	Jun	Jul	Aug	Sep	Oct	Nov	Dec	Year
Daily mean °C (°F)	1.7 (35.1)	1.8 (35.2)	4.4 (39.9)	10.3 (50.5)	14.4 (57.9)	17.6 (63.7)	21.7 (71.1)	20.5 (68.9)	16.9 (62.4)	11.8 (53.2)	7.7 (45.9)	3.8 (38.8)	11.1 (51.9)
Mean daily minimum °C (°F)	−2.0 (28.4)	−1.5 (29.3)	1.5 (34.7)	7.2 (45.0)	10.6 (51.1)	14.7 (58.5)	17.0 (62.6)	16.4 (61.5)	14.1 (57.4)	8.4 (47.1)	4.4 (39.9)	1.0 (33.8)	7.7 (45.8)
Average precipitation mm (inches)	43 (1.7)	40 (1.6)	49 (1.9)	42 (1.7)	58 (2.3)	36 (1.4)	18 (0.7)	47 (1.9)	63 (2.5)	97 (3.8)	72 (2.8)	41 (1.6)	606 (23.9)
Average rainy days	7	7	9	8	10	5	4	5	8	10	9	7	89
Source: NCEI

== Demographics ==
According to Caucasian Calendar of 1915, 145 people, mainly the Azerbaijanis shown in the calendar as Tatars, lived in Yardimli village of Lankaran Uyezd of Baku Governorate in 1914. According to a census of 1979, 3114 people and according to a census of 1989, 3438 people lived in Yardimli. According to a census of 2010, the city's population consists of 6700 people.
