= Dzherimbel =

- Location within Azerbaijan
- Coordinates: 39°15′N 48°23′E
- Country: Azerbaijan
- Rayon: Jalilabad
- Time zone: UTC+4 (AZT)
  - Summer (DST): UTC+5 (AZT)

Dzherimbel (also, Dzherimbel’ and Dzhirimbel’) is a village in the Jalilabad Rayon of Azerbaijan.
