= Şiləvəngə, Jalilabad =

Şiləvəngə
- Municipality
- Location within Azerbaijan
- Coordinates: 39°15′34″N 48°26′05″E
- Country: Azerbaijan
- Rayon: Jalilabad

Population
  - Total: 1,068
- Time zone: UTC+4 (AZT)
  - Summer (DST): UTC+5 (AZT)

Şiləvəngə (also, Shilavegyakh, Shilavengya, and Shilyavyangya) is a village and municipality in the Jalilabad Rayon of Azerbaijan. It has a population of 1,068.

== Notable natives ==
- Faig Jafarov — National Hero of Azerbaijan.
