= Gendərə, Ismailli =

Gendərə
- Location within Azerbaijan
- Coordinates: 40°55′N 48°24′E
- Country: Azerbaijan
- Rayon: Ismailli
- Time zone: UTC+4 (AZT)
  - Summer (DST): UTC+5 (AZT)

Gendərə (also, Gëndere) is a village in the Ismailli Rayon of Azerbaijan.
