= Bozayran, Jalilabad =

Baladzha Bozayran
- Location within Azerbaijan
- Coordinates: 39°19′N 48°20′E
- Country: Azerbaijan
- Rayon: Jalilabad
- Time zone: UTC+4 (AZT)
  - Summer (DST): UTC+5 (AZT)

Bozayran (also, Baladzha Bozayran, Malyy Bazayran) is a village in the Jalilabad Rayon of Azerbaijan.
