= Çanaqbulaq, Qabala =

Çanaqbulaq
- Location within Azerbaijan Location within Shaki-Zagatala Economic Region
- Coordinates: 40°47′13″N 47°39′09″E
- Country: Azerbaijan
- Rayon: Qabala
- Time zone: UTC+4 (AZT)
  - Summer (DST): UTC+5 (AZT)

Çanaqbulaq (also, Chanakhbulag and Chanakhbulak) is a village in the Qabala Rayon of Azerbaijan.
