= Yardimli District =

District in southeastern Azerbaijan

Coordinates: 38°55′14″N 48°14′14″E

- District
- Map of Azerbaijan showing Yardimli District
- Country: Azerbaijan
- Region: Lankaran-Astara
- Established: 8 August 1930
- Capital: Yardimli
- Settlements: 88

Government
  - Governor: Ayaz Asgerov

Area
  - Total: 670 km^{2} (260 sq mi)

Population (2020)
  - Total: 68,000
  - Density: 100/km^{2} (260/sq mi)
- Time zone: UTC+4 (AZT)
- Postal code: 6500
- Website: yardimli-ih.gov.az

Yardimli District (Azerbaijani: Yardımlı rayonu) is one of the 66 districts of Azerbaijan. It is located in the south-east of the country and is part of the Lankaran-Astara Economic Region. The district borders the districts of Jalilabad, Masally, Lerik, and the Ardabil Province of Iran. Its capital and largest city is Yardimli. As of 2020, the district had a population of 68,000.

== History ==
The district was called the village Vargaduz, part of Lankaran Uyezd from 1920 to 1930. In 1930, it was renamed the Vargaduz district. It has been named Yardimli region since 1938, with Yardimli as the center of the district.

== Geography ==
The rayon borders upon Iran (length of the state border in the south and west is equal to 96 km) and Lerik District (40 km), Masally District (11 km), Jalilabad District (20 km) of Azerbaijan. Yardimli is located within the mountainous region in the southeastern part of Azerbaijan, within 39 ° -38 ° north longitude, 48 ° -49 ° east longitude. The length of the border with Lerik from the south is 40 km, from east to Masalli is 11 km, from north-east to Jalilabad region is 20 km. The length of the state border with the northern and western is 96 km with the Islamic Republic of Iran. The Vilesh River is the longest and full-flowing river of the rayon. Its length is equal to 11 km. Talysh Mountains (Shahnishin Mountain equal to 2,490 metres (8,170 ft) is its highest summit), mountains of Peshtasar Mountain ridge (its highest summit is 2,244 metres (7,362 ft)) and mountains of Burovar Mountain ridge occupy the territory of the rayon.

The region covers 66.720 hectares of land. Forest in the district covers 20,536 hectares. Yardimli land zones consist of mountain-forest-brown soils, brown-mountain-forest lands, mountain-meadow lands. The mechanical components of the soils are overwhelming gill, clay, medium gill. The Vilash Stream is the biggest waterway in the district. Allar, Peshtasar, Solgard, and Valishli waterways are the valleys of the Vilash Stream. The area consists of the Talysh Mountains (the highest peak of the locale, in height 2490 m), Pashtasa mountain range (the tallest peak within the locale is Pechtasar, in height 2244 m) and is encompassed by Mount Burwar.

Within the woods, valuable trees are beech, hornbeam, mammoth birch, rainbow, bushes, hips, oak, gulls. Within the timberlands, there are wild animals such as foxes, wolves, pigs, squirrels, jackals and badgers, as well as wild cat and beech.

=== Climate ===
Climate is warm, ordinary, sodden, winter is delicate, spring is hot. The average yearly temperature is +11.9 degrees C, the rainfall is 586 mm, the wind is west-south, the average speed is 1.6meters per second, the depth of groundwater is 4,5 meters, and the seismic rating is 7 points.

== Demography ==
=== Population ===
According to the State Statistics Committee, as of 2019, the population of the city was 67,000 persons, which had increased by 17,000 persons (about 34 percent) from 50,000 persons in 2000. Of the total population, 34,300 are men and 32,700 are women. In 2018, more than 29.6 percent of the population (about 19,600 persons) was aged 14–29.

Population of Yardimli by the year (at the beginning of the year, thsd. persons)
	2000	2001	2002	2003	2004	2005	2006	2007	2008	2009	2010	2011	2012	2013	2014	2015	2016	2017	2018	2019
Total population	50,0	50,9	51,8	52,6	53,4	54,2	55,3	56,1	57,0	57,8	58,7	59,6	60,6	61,5	62,4	63,3	64,2	65,2	66,1	67,0
Urban population	4,0	4,3	4,6	4,9	5,2	5,5	5,8	6,0	6,3	6,6	6,7	6,7	6,8	6,9	7,0	7,1	7,2	7,3	7,4	7,5
Rural population	46,0	46,6	47,2	47,7	48,2	48,7	49,5	50,1	50,7	51,2	52,0	52,9	53,8	54,6	55,4	56,2	57,0	57,9	58,7	59,5

=== Ethnic structure ===
Ethnic group	1970 c.		1979 c.		1989 c.		1999 c.		2009 c.	
Ethnic group	Number	%	Number	%	Number	%	Number	%	Number	%
Total	27 705	100.00	34 026	100.00	39 932	100.00	49 039	100.00	58 073	100.00
Azerbaijanian	27 247	98.35	33 397	98.15			49 001	99.92	58 067	99.99
Russians	323	1.17	390	1.15			24	0.05	3	0.01
Ukrainians	67	0.24	131	0.38			10	0.02	...	...
Tatars	6	0.02	8	0.02			1	0.00	...	...
Lezgins	6	0.02	24	0.07			...	...	...	...
Armenians	23	0.08	17	0.05			...	...	...	...
Avars	...	...	5	0.01			...	...	...	...
Georgians	8	0.03	5	0.01			...	...	...	...
Jews	6	0.02	...	...			...	...	...	...
Mountain Jews	1	0.01	...	...			...	...	...	...
Tats	1	0.01	...	...			...	...	...	...
other	17	0.06	49	0.14			3	0.01	3	0.01

== Economy ==
In 2015, 94 million 583 thousand manats gross product was produced in the region, which is 8.8% more than compared with the same period last year and 10.3 times more than in comparison with 2003. Per capita production increased by 3.64 times compared to 2003, by 7% compared with the previous year and amounted to 1471 manat.

== Education ==
There are 80 secondary schools in the district, including 42 full-time secondary schools, 22 secondary schools, 16 primary schools, 3 pre-schools and 5 out-of-school institutions.

== Gallery ==
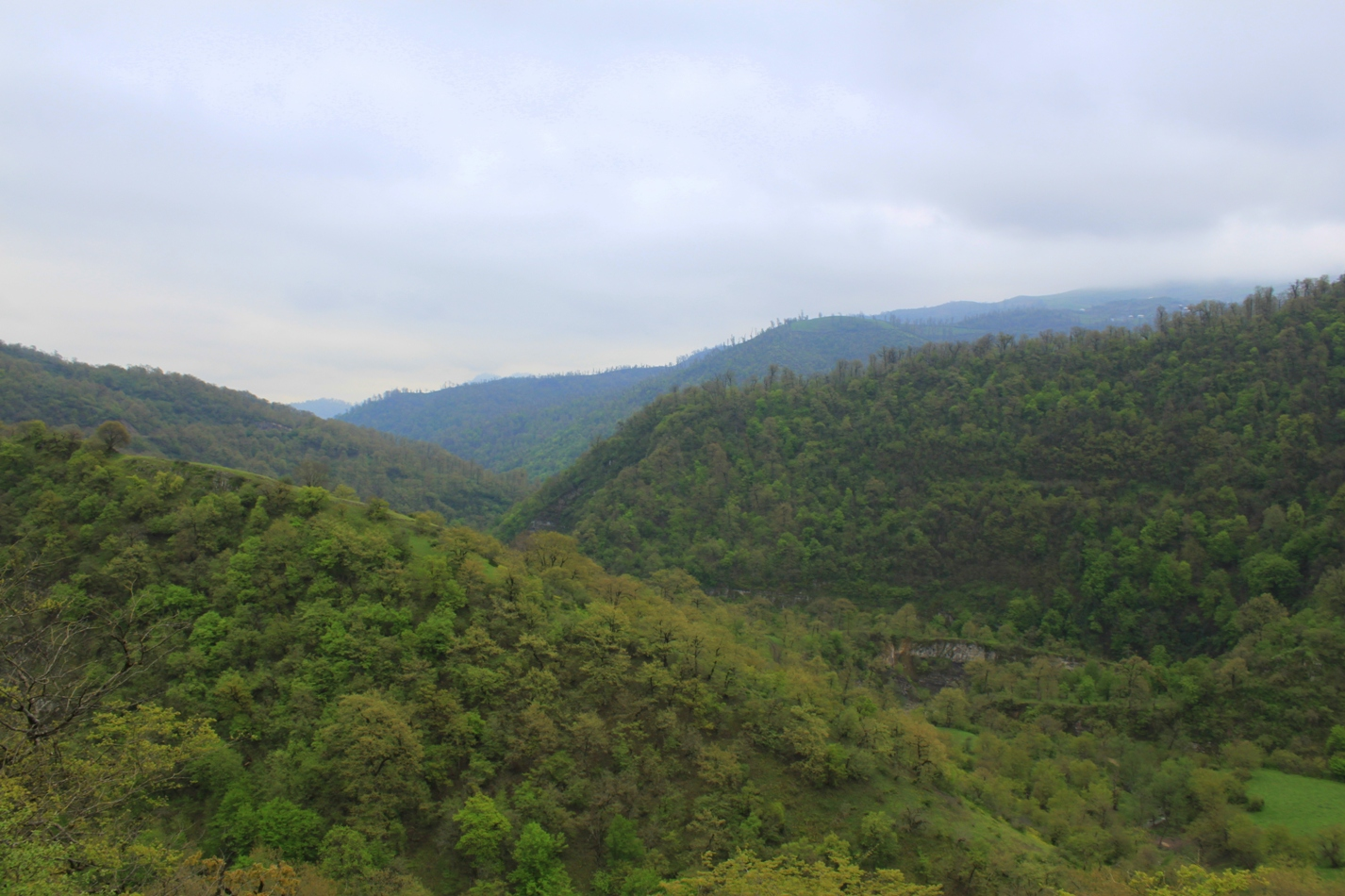

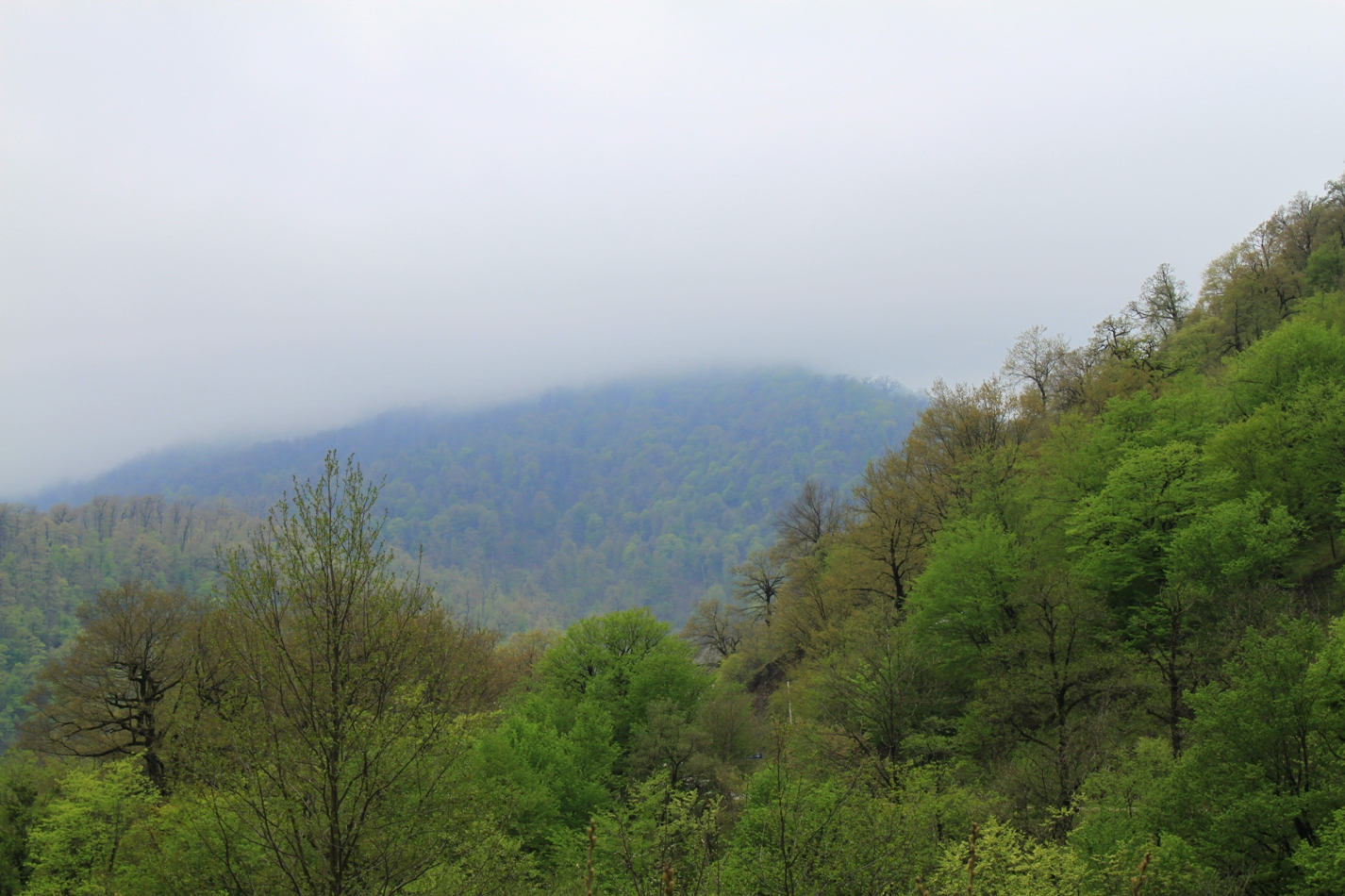

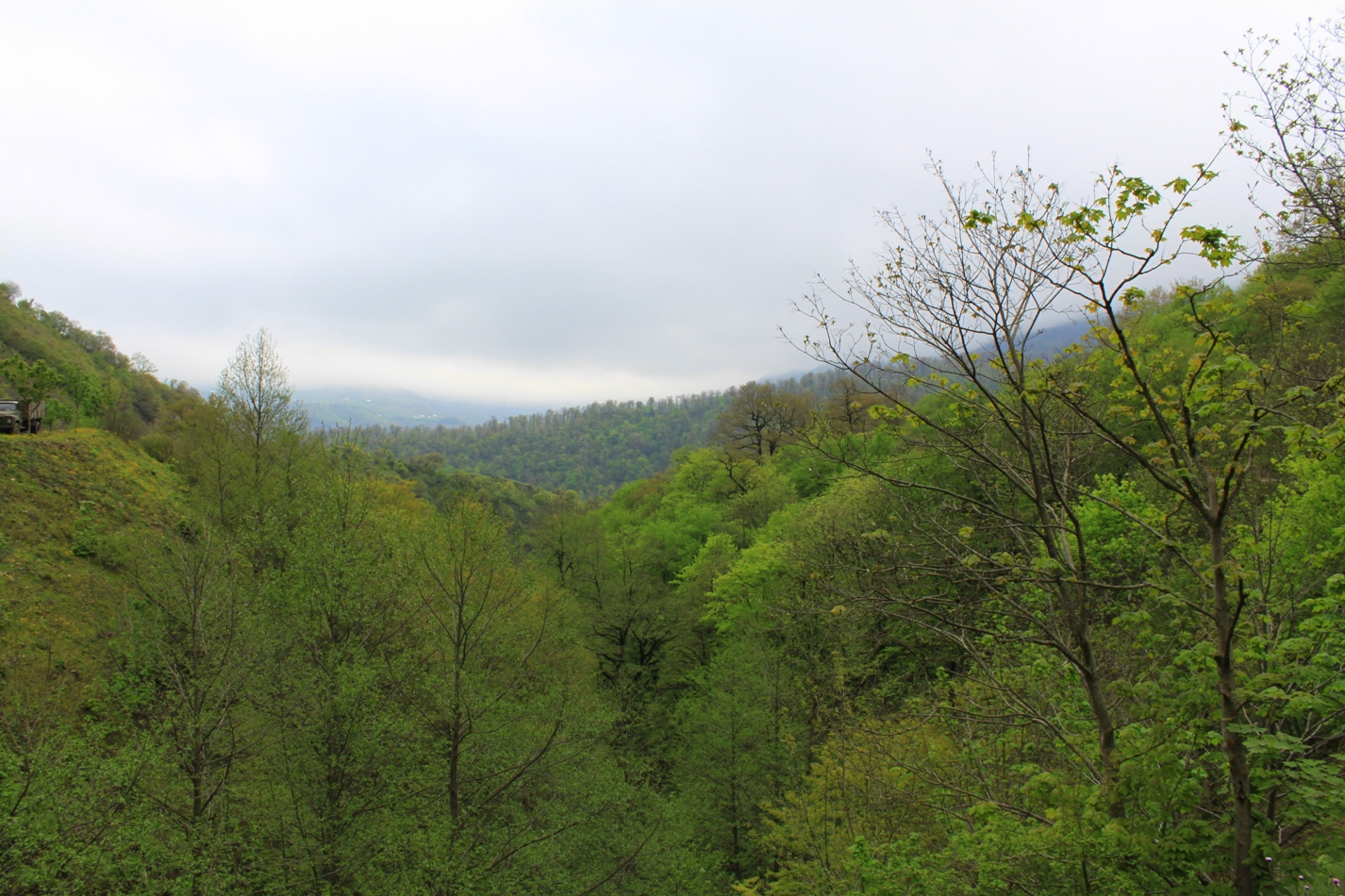

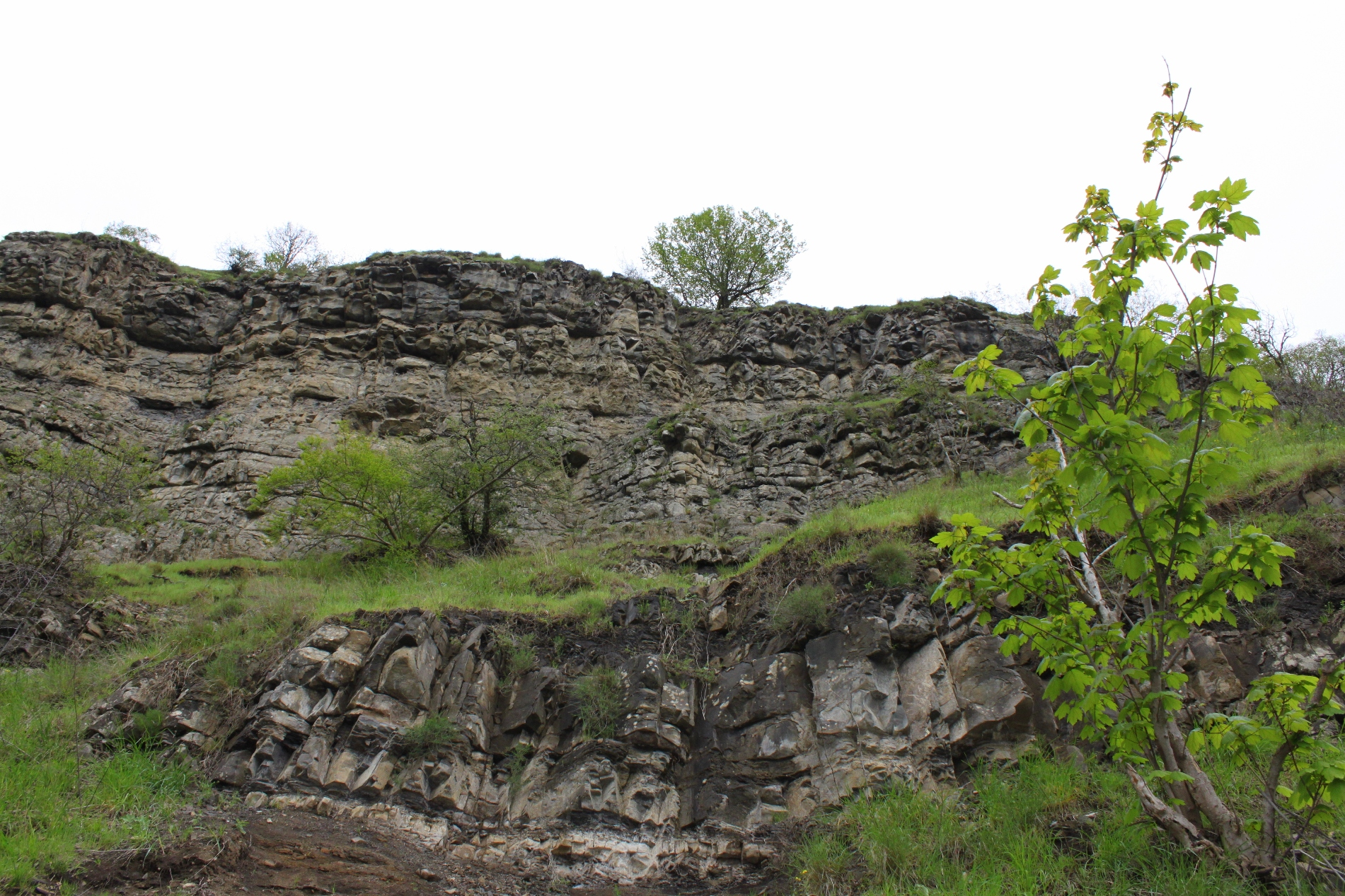

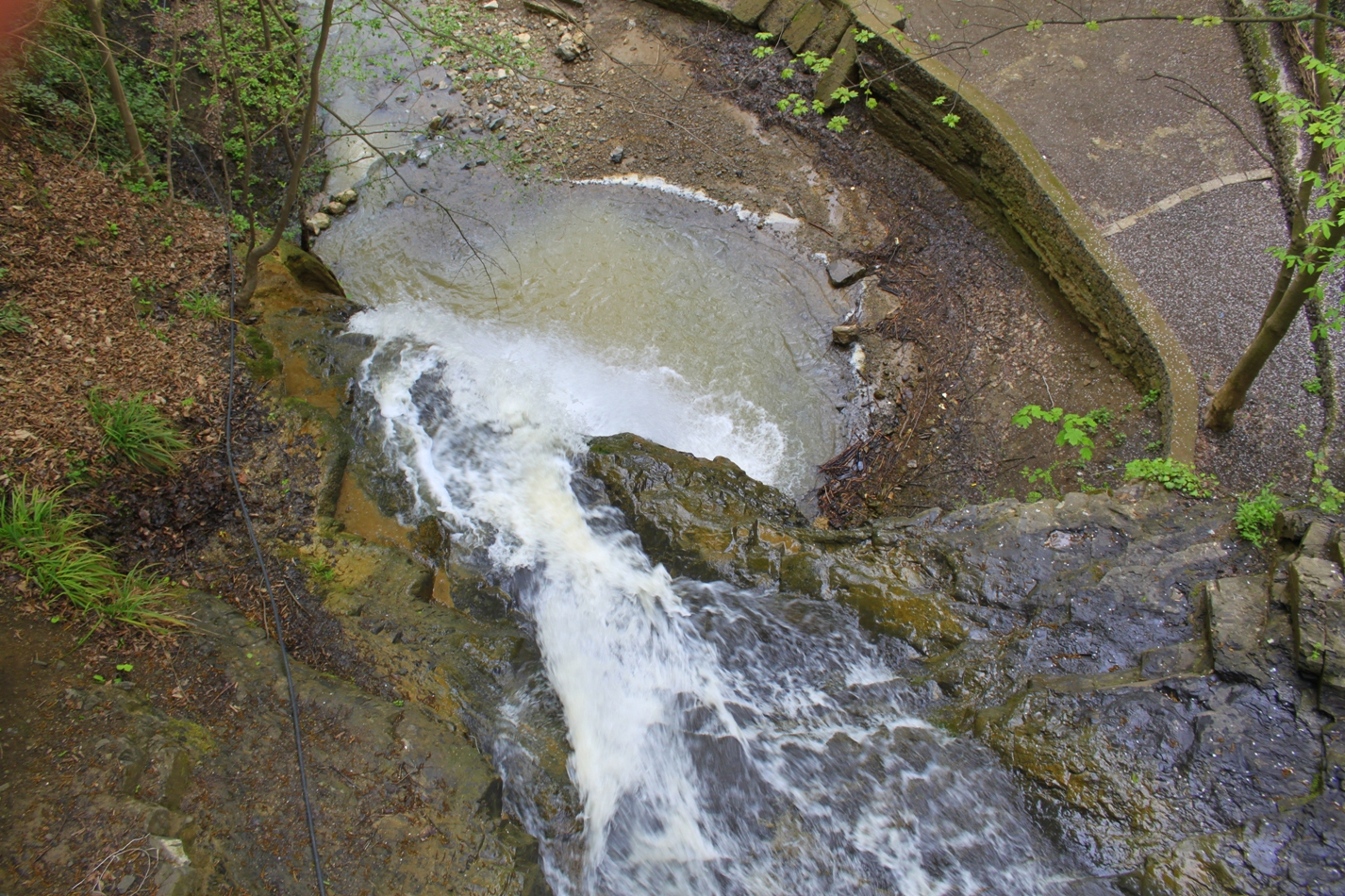

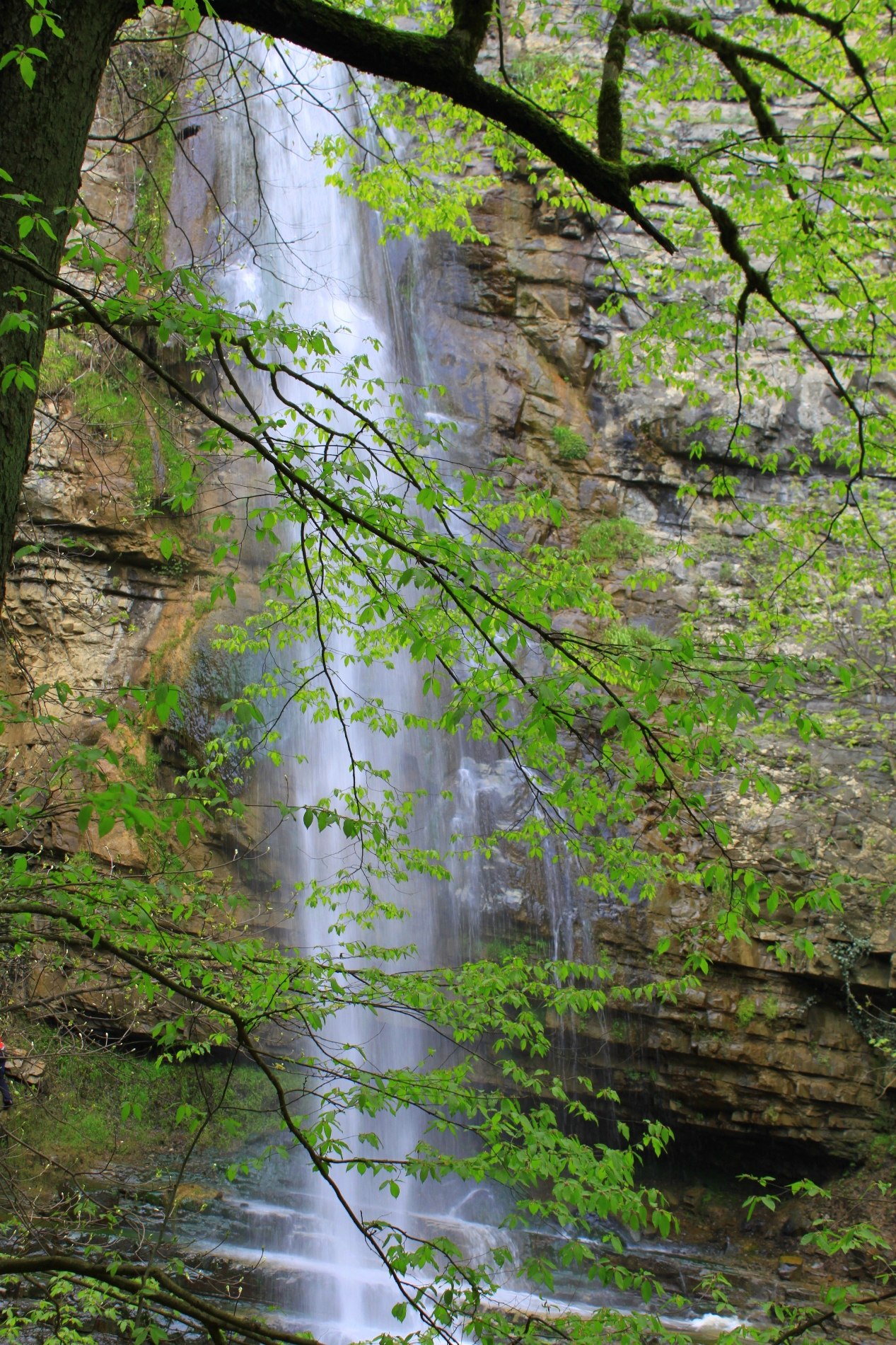

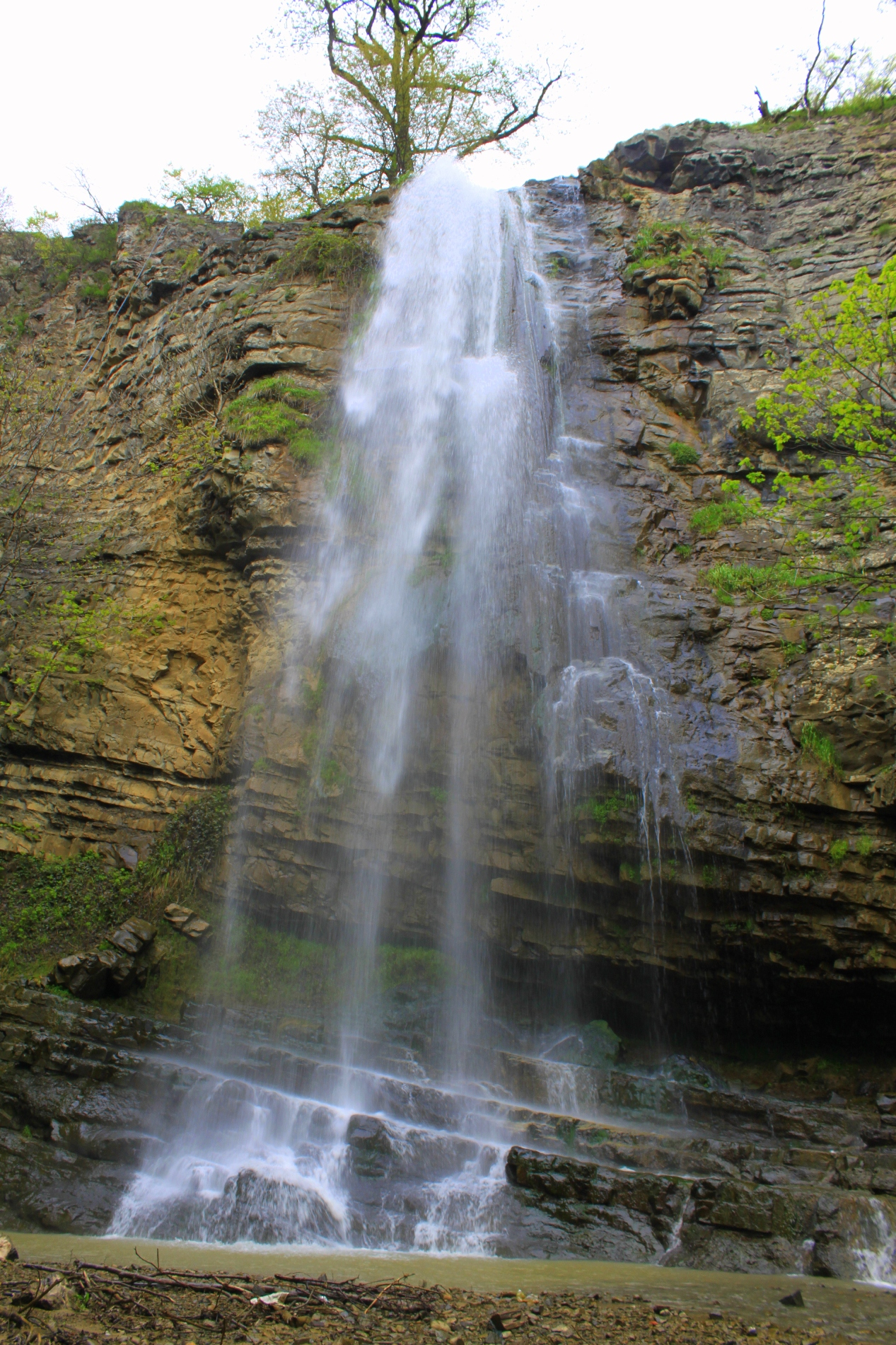

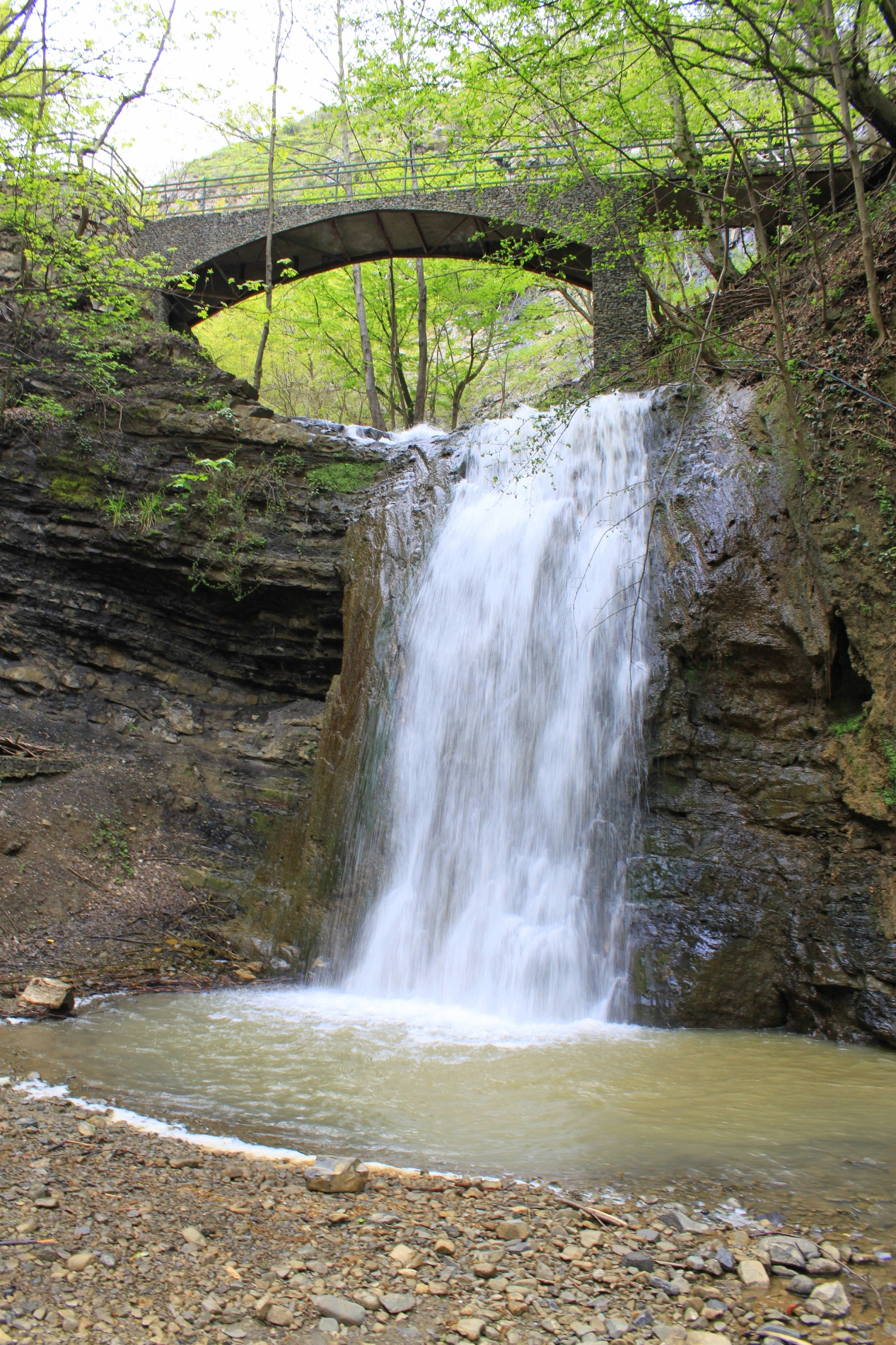
