= Bilnə =

Bilnə or Bilna, Bilnya or Bil’nya or Bilinya may refer to:

- Bilnə, Yardymli, Azerbaijan
- Aşağı Bilnə, Azerbaijan
- Yuxarı Bilnə, Azerbaijan
