= Bradi =

Village in Azerbaijan

Bradi (also written as Burady) is a village and municipality in the Lerik Rayon of Azerbaijan, with a population of 155. The municipality consists of the villages of Aşağı Bradi ("Lower Bradi") and Yuxarı Bradi ("Upper Bradi").
