= Lerik =

Lerik may refer to:

- Lerik (rayon)
- Lerik, Azerbaijan
