= Pirəsora =

Pirasora
- Municipality
- Pirəsora
- Location within Azerbaijan
- Coordinates: 38°43′14″N 48°22′51″E
- Country: Azerbaijan
- Rayon: Lerik

Population
  - Total: 2,298
- Time zone: UTC+4 (AZT)
  - Summer (DST): UTC+5 (AZT)

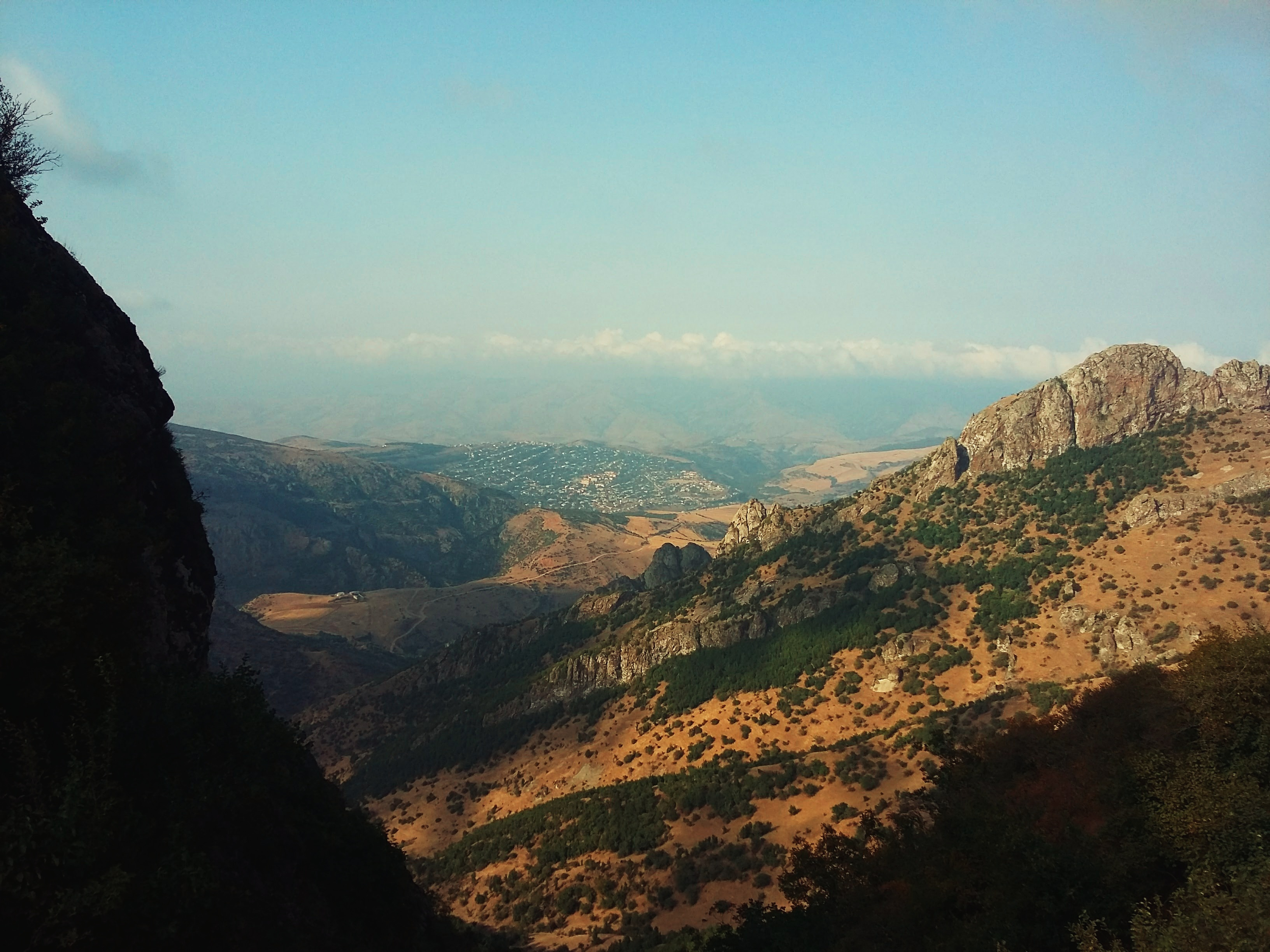
Pirəsora

Pirəsora (also, Pirasora) is a village and the most populous municipality, other than the capital Lerik, in the Lerik Rayon of Azerbaijan. It has a population of 2,298.It is mainly known for being the alleged birthplace of Mahmud Eyvazov, a man who claimed to have lived for 152 years, supposedly from 1808 until 1960.
