= Mahmud Eyvazov =

Azerbaijani longevity claimant

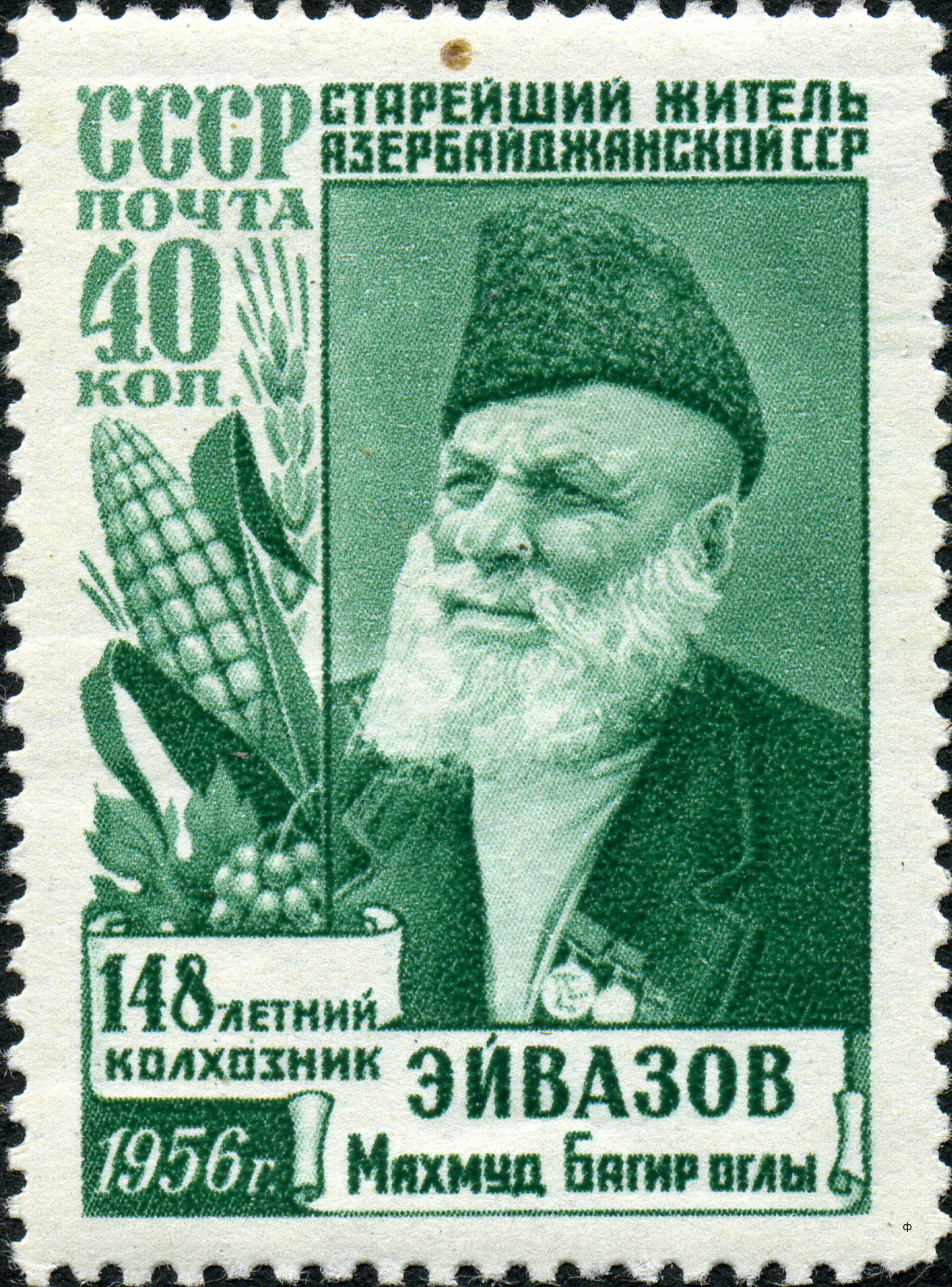
- Eyvazov on a postage stamp of the USSR, issued to mark his supposed 148th birthday.
- Born: February 7, 1808 (allegedly); Pirəsora, Talysh Khanate
- Died: December 3, 1960 (aged 152 years, 300 days); Pirəsora, Azerbaijan SSR, Soviet Union
- Occupation: farmer
- Known for: Longevity claim

Mahmud Bagir oglu Eyvazov (Azerbaijani: Mahmud Bağır oğlu Eyvazov; claimed to have lived 7 February 1808 – 3 December 1960) was a well-known Azerbaijani long-lived collective farmer (originally from a mountain Talysh village). According to Soviet officials, he lived for 152 years and 300 days.

== Biography ==
Data on the alleged age of Eyvazov, a resident of the high-mountainous (2,200 m (7,200 ft) above sea level) village of Pirəsora in the Lerik District of Azerbaijan, first became known after the all-Union census of the USSR in 1959. According to official data, Mahmud Eyvazov was 150 years old in the year of the census. Eyvazov's work experience was also a record: 135 years.

According to the teacher of the local secondary school in the village of Pirəsora, Enver Agayev, Mahmud Eyvazov was not tall, but well-built, of medium fullness, gray-bearded, with intelligent eyes and a moving face. He was very talkative and affectionate. He never used glasses and never complained about his eyesight. True, there were problems with hearing. He did not recognize prostheses, although there were no teeth left in his mouth. Hardened gums did a great job even with lamb skewers.

In his life he did not drink alcohol nor smoke shop cigarettes, but carefully crushed shag in his fingers and poured it into a long smoking pipe. He smoked mercilessly, which made the organizers of official ceremonies sick and in tears. Therefore, Mahmud was persuaded for a long time to switch to Kazbek. According to the centenarian, he "never drank, did not smoke and did not lie".

Decree of the Presidium of the Supreme Soviet of the USSR No. 234/88 of March 27, 1956 “Noting the great labor activity in collective farm production and in connection with the 148th anniversary of his birth, to award a member of the Komsomol agricultural artel of the Lerik region of the Azerbaijan SSR comrade. Eyvazov Mahmud Bagir ogly with the Order of the Red Banner of Labour” was published on March 28, 1956, in central newspapers.

In 1957, Eyvazov was still working in the highlands on the Komsomol collective farm.

In 1958, Enver Agayev, as an interpreter, accompanied Mahmud Eyvazov during his one and a half month stay in Moscow. Here Mahmoud met with representatives of 11 foreign delegations who were interested in the phenomenon of longevity. Foreign guests looked at him with curiosity and asked him countless questions.

In the same year, a radio receiver was installed in the house of Mahmud Eyvazov. On his initiative, a school was built in the village of Pirsora. He was awarded the Gold Medal of VDNKh of the USSR. All the awards, together with the astrakhan hat given to him by Marshal K. Voroshilov, and the carpet, his mother's dowry, are kept as priceless exhibits in the Lerik Local History Museum.

The biography of Mahmud Eyvazov was the basis of the novel Son of the Mountains by the Azerbaijani writer Mammadhussein Aliyev (the book was first published in 1977). The house of Mahmud Eyvazov is one of the fourteen tourist attractions in the Lerik region of Azerbaijan.

== See also ==
- Supercentenarian
- Shirali Muslimov
