= Bilavar =

Bilavar may refer to:

- Bilavər, Kermanshah
- Bilavar District, Kermanshah province, Iran
- Bilavar Rural District, Kurdistan province, Iran
