= Şonaçola =

Şonacola
- Municipality
- Location within Azerbaijan
- Coordinates: 38°41′43″N 48°24′44″E
- Country: Azerbaijan
- Rayon: Lerik

Population
  - Total: 552
- Time zone: UTC+4 (AZT)
  - Summer (DST): UTC+5 (AZT)

Şonacola (also, Şonayçola, Shona-Chola, and Shonadzhola) is a village and municipality in the Lerik Rayon of Azerbaijan. It has a population of 552. The municipality consists of the villages of Şonacola, Qosələr, Divağac, and Hovari.
