= Hamarat =

- Municipality
- Location within Azerbaijan
- Coordinates: 38°38′50″N 48°34′45″E
- Country: Azerbaijan
- Rayon: Lerik

Population
  - Total: 894
- Time zone: UTC+4 (AZT)
  - Summer (DST): UTC+5 (AZT)

Hamarat (also, Gamarat) is a village and municipality in the Lerik Rayon of Azerbaijan. It has a population of 894. The municipality consists of the villages of Hamarat and Dızdipok.
