= Nüsomurya =

- Municipality
- Location within Azerbaijan
- Coordinates: 38°49′N 48°25′E
- Country: Azerbaijan
- Rayon: Lerik

Population
  - Total: 225
- Time zone: UTC+4 (AZT)
  - Summer (DST): UTC+5 (AZT)

Nüsomurya (also, Nesamur’ya and Nyusomur’ya) is a village and municipality in the Lerik Rayon of Azerbaijan. It has a population of 225. The municipality consists of the villages of Nüsomurya and Qadimkücə.
