= Nüravud =

- Municipality
- Location within Azerbaijan
- Coordinates: 38°46′23″N 48°21′09″E
- Country: Azerbaijan
- Rayon: Lerik

Population
  - Total: 1,542
- Time zone: UTC+4 (AZT)
  - Summer (DST): UTC+5 (AZT)

Nüravud (also, Nuravad, Nuravud, Nuravut, and Nyuravud) is a village and municipality in the Lerik Rayon of Azerbaijan. It has a population of 1,542. The municipality consists of the villages of Nüravud, Köhnə Orand, Soruşçay, and Zərdəbərə.
