= Burkandul =

- Municipality
- Location within Azerbaijan
- Coordinates: 38°49′03″N 48°30′29″E
- Country: Azerbaijan
- Rayon: Lerik

Population
  - Total: 776
- Time zone: UTC+4 (AZT)
  - Summer (DST): UTC+5 (AZT)

Burkandul (Talysh: Bırkandül) is a village and municipality in the Lerik Rayon of Azerbaijan. It has a population of 776. The municipality consists of the villages of Burkandul and Qırxıncı.
