= Kirəvud =

- Municipality
- Location within Azerbaijan
- Coordinates: 38°50′46″N 48°27′22″E
- Country: Azerbaijan
- Rayon: Lerik

Population
  - Total: 262
- Time zone: UTC+4 (AZT)
  - Summer (DST): UTC+5 (AZT)

Kirəvud (Talysh: Kırəvu) is a village and municipality in the Lerik Rayon of Azerbaijan. It has a population of 262.
