= Kirabin =

- Location within Azerbaijan
- Coordinates: 38°52′N 48°24′E
- Country: Azerbaijan
- Rayon: Lerik
- Time zone: UTC+4 (AZT)
  - Summer (DST): UTC+5 (AZT)

Kirabin (also known as Kiryabin) is a village in the Lerik Rayon of Azerbaijan.
