= Bobla =

- Municipality
- Location within Azerbaijan
- Coordinates: 38°41′N 48°41′E
- Country: Azerbaijan
- Rayon: Lerik

Population
  - Total: 490
- Time zone: UTC+4 (AZT)
  - Summer (DST): UTC+5 (AZT)

Bobla is a village and municipality in the Lerik Rayon of Azerbaijan. It has a population of 490. The municipality consists of the villages of Bobla, Əncəqov, and Zeynəko.
