= Durğan =

- Municipality
- Location within Azerbaijan
- Coordinates: 38°50′N 48°24′E
- Country: Azerbaijan
- Rayon: Lerik

Population
  - Total: 441
- Time zone: UTC+4 (AZT)
  - Summer (DST): UTC+5 (AZT)

Durğan (also, Durqan and Durgan) is a village and municipality in the Lerik Rayon of Azerbaijan. It has a population of 441.
