= Qucu =

Village in Lerik District, Azerbaijan

Coordinates: 38.721944°N 48.615°E

Qucu is a village in the municipality of Davaradibi in the Lerik Rayon of Azerbaijan.
