= Valeh Muslumov =

- Müslümov Valeh Əlizaid oğlu
- Born: September 2, 1968; Lerik, Azerbaijan
- Died: April 14, 1992 (aged 23); Aghdara, Azerbaijan
- Military career
- Allegiance: Republic of Azerbaijan
- Conflicts: First Nagorno-Karabakh War
- Awards: National Hero of Azerbaijan; 1992

Valeh Muslumov (Azerbaijani: Müslümov Valeh Əlizaid oğlu) (September 2, 1968, Lerik, Azerbaijan – Aprel 14, 1992, Aghdara, Azerbaijan) was the National Hero of Azerbaijan, and a soldier of the First Nagorno-Karabakh War.

== Life ==
Valeh Muslumov was born on September 4, 1968, into a Talysh family in Lerik, Azerbaijan. In 1983, he graduated from Secondary School #2 in Lerik and entered Vocational School #17 in Sumgait. His first work experience was in a construction trust. He served in the Azerbaijani Armed Forces from 1986 to 1988.

== Military activities ==
Muslumov began his military career in August 1991 in the Special Forces of the Ministry of Internal Affairs of the Republic of Azerbaijan. He participated in battles in the Shusha, Khojaly, Tovuz, Fuzuli, Qubadlu, Zangilan, and Aghdara regions. Muslumov was wounded in a fight with the Armenian army on April 14, 1992, while rescuing his soldiers in the village of Marqushan in the Agdere region. One day later, he died as a result of his wounds.

== Memorial ==
By the Decree of the President of the Republic of Azerbaijan Number 831, dated 6 June 1992, Muslumov was posthumously awarded the honorary title of "National Hero of Azerbaijan". In memory of Muslumov's 20th anniversary of his death in 2012, a memorial museum was created at the school named after him. One of the streets in the Lerik District was named after him.

== Sources ==
- Vüqar Əsgərov. "Azərbaycanın Milli Qəhrəmanları" (Yenidən işlənmiş II nəşr). Bakı: "Dərələyəz-M", 2010, səh. 221.
