= Əncəqov =

Ancəqəv
- Location within Azerbaijan
- Coordinates: 38°40′22″N 48°40′54″E
- Country: Azerbaijan
- Rayon: Lerik
- Municipality: Bobla
- Time zone: UTC+4 (AZT)
  - Summer (DST): UTC+5 (AZT)

Ancəqəv is a village in the Lerik Rayon of Azerbaijan. The village forms part of the municipality of Bobla.
