= Züvüc =

- Municipality
- Location within Azerbaijan
- Coordinates: 38°51′49″N 48°20′00″E
- Country: Azerbaijan
- Rayon: Lerik

Population
  - Total: 1,117
- Time zone: UTC+4 (AZT)
  - Summer (DST): UTC+5 (AZT)

Züvüc (also, Zuvüc, Züvüç, Zuvich, and Zuvuch) is a village and municipality in the Lerik Rayon of Azerbaijan. It has a population of 1,117.
