= Lüləkəran =

- Municipality
- Location within Azerbaijan
- Coordinates: 38°44′N 48°25′E
- Country: Azerbaijan
- Rayon: Lerik

Population
  - Total: 578
- Time zone: UTC+4 (AZT)
  - Summer (DST): UTC+5 (AZT)

Lüləkəran (also, Lyalyakyaran and Lyulyakeran) is a village and municipality in the Lerik Rayon of Azerbaijan. It has a population of 578.
