= Xəlfəhonu =

Village in Lerik District, Azerbaijan

Coordinates: 38.670278°N 48.605°E

Xəlfəhonu is a village in the municipality of Siyov in the Lerik Rayon of Azerbaijan.
