= Köhnə Orand =

- Village
- Location within Azerbaijan
- Country: Azerbaijan
- Rayon: Lerik
- Time zone: UTC+4 (AZT)
  - Summer (DST): UTC+5 (AZT)

Köhnə Orand is a village in the municipality of Nüravud in the Lerik Rayon of Azerbaijan.
