= Mastail =

- Municipality
- Location within Azerbaijan
- Coordinates: 38°47′23″N 48°23′25″E
- Country: Azerbaijan
- Rayon: Lerik

Population
  - Total: 916
- Time zone: UTC+4 (AZT)
  - Summer (DST): UTC+5 (AZT)

Mastail is a village and municipality in the Lerik Rayon of Azerbaijan. It has a population of 916.
