= Çeşman =

- Municipality
- Location within Azerbaijan
- Coordinates: 38°52′01″N 48°20′10″E
- Country: Azerbaijan
- Rayon: Lerik

Population
  - Total: 237
- Time zone: UTC+4 (AZT)
  - Summer (DST): UTC+5 (AZT)

Çeşman (Talysh: Çəşmon) is a village and municipality in the Lerik Rayon of Azerbaijan. It has a population of 237.
