= Davaradibi =

- Municipality
- Location within Azerbaijan
- Coordinates: 38°43′19″N 48°36′54″E
- Country: Azerbaijan
- Rayon: Lerik

Population
  - Total: 410
- Time zone: UTC+4 (AZT)
  - Summer (DST): UTC+5 (AZT)

Davaradibi (also, Davaradabi) is a village and municipality in the Lerik Rayon of Azerbaijan. It has a population of 410. The municipality consists of the villages of Davaradibi and Qucu.
