= Peştətük =

Municipality in Lerik, Azerbaijan

Coordinates: 38°47′N 48°32′E

Peştətük (known as Otuz Yeddinci Kilometr until 1991) is a village and municipality in the Lerik Rayon of Azerbaijan. It has a population of 197.
