= Nisli =

- Municipality
- Location within Azerbaijan
- Coordinates: 38°42′16″N 48°26′24″E
- Country: Azerbaijan
- Rayon: Lerik

Population
  - Total: 291
- Time zone: UTC+4 (AZT)
  - Summer (DST): UTC+5 (AZT)

Nisli (also, Nesli) is a village and municipality in the Lerik Rayon of Azerbaijan. It has a population of 291. The municipality consists of the villages of Nisli and Xozavi.
