= Qılqılov =

- Municipality
- Location within Azerbaijan
- Coordinates: 38°40′N 48°36′E
- Country: Azerbaijan
- Rayon: Lerik

Population
  - Total: 291
- Time zone: UTC+4 (AZT)
  - Summer (DST): UTC+5 (AZT)

Qılqılov (also, Qılqlov, Gel’glov, and Gylglov) is a village and municipality in the Lerik Rayon of Azerbaijan, having a population of 291.
