= Xozavi =

- Location within Azerbaijan
- Coordinates: 38°42′N 48°27′E
- Country: Azerbaijan
- Rayon: Lerik
- Municipality: Nisli
- Time zone: UTC+4 (AZT)
  - Summer (DST): UTC+5 (AZT)

Xozavi (also, Khazovi and Khozavi) is a village in the Lerik Rayon of Azerbaijan. The village forms part of the municipality of Nisli.
