= Siyov =

- Municipality
- Location within Azerbaijan
- Coordinates: 38°40′13″N 48°36′18″E
- Country: Azerbaijan
- Rayon: Lerik

Population
  - Total: 1,120
- Time zone: UTC+4 (AZT)
  - Summer (DST): UTC+5 (AZT)

Siyov (also, Silov and Siov) is a village and municipality in the Lerik Rayon of Azerbaijan. It has a population of 1,120. The municipality consists of the villages of Siyov, Xəlfəhonu, and Akuşapeştə.
