= Bülüdül =

- Municipality
- Location within Azerbaijan
- Coordinates: 38°50′19″N 48°18′34″E
- Country: Azerbaijan
- Rayon: Lerik

Population
  - Total: 685
- Time zone: UTC+4 (AZT)
  - Summer (DST): UTC+5 (AZT)

Bülüdül (Talysh: Bulidul) is a village and municipality in the Lerik Rayon of Azerbaijan. It has a population of 685.
