= Pirzəkücə =

Village and municipality in Lerik Rayon, Azerbaijan

Coordinates: 38°45′N 48°27′E

Pirzəkücə (also known as Pirəzküçə) is a village and municipality in the Lerik Rayon of Azerbaijan. It has a population of 356.
