= Vamazğon =

- Location within Azerbaijan
- Coordinates: 38°55′44″N 48°31′53″E
- Country: Azerbaijan
- Rayon: Lerik
- Municipality: Davıdonu
- Time zone: UTC+4 (AZT)
  - Summer (DST): UTC+5 (AZT)

Vamazğon (also, Vamazqon, Vamazgon, and Vomadzogony) is a village in the Lerik Rayon of Azerbaijan. The village forms part of the municipality of Davıdonu.
