= Noda, Azerbaijan =

Noda
- Municipality
- Location within Azerbaijan
- Coordinates: 38°48′46″N 48°27′44″E
- Country: Azerbaijan
- Rayon: Lerik

Population
  - Total: 1,215
- Time zone: UTC+4 (AZT)
  - Summer (DST): UTC+5 (AZT)

Noda (Talysh: Nodə) is a village and municipality in the Lerik Rayon of Azerbaijan. It has a population of 1,215. The municipality consists of the villages of Noda and Aşağı Bilnə.
