= Boykəndil =

- Municipality
- Location within Azerbaijan
- Coordinates: 38°51′52″N 48°26′23″E
- Country: Azerbaijan
- Rayon: Lerik

Population
  - Total: 226
- Time zone: UTC+4 (AZT)
  - Summer (DST): UTC+5 (AZT)

Boykəndil (also, Boykandul) is a village and municipality in the Lerik Rayon of Azerbaijan. It has a population of 226.
