= Piyəküçə =

- Location within Azerbaijan
- Coordinates: 38°43′N 48°29′E
- Country: Azerbaijan
- Rayon: Lerik
- Municipality: Andurma
- Time zone: UTC+4 (AZT)
  - Summer (DST): UTC+5 (AZT)

Piyəküçə is a village in the municipality of Andurma in the Lerik Rayon of Azerbaijan.
