= Bibiyani =

Bibiyoni
- Municipality
- Location within Azerbaijan
- Coordinates: 38°44′46″N 48°34′27″E
- Country: Azerbaijan
- Rayon: Lerik

Population
  - Total: 849
- Time zone: UTC+4 (AZT)
  - Summer (DST): UTC+5 (AZT)

Bibiyoni (also, Bibinoni, Bibiyani, Bibiany, and Bibioni) is a village and municipality in the Lerik Rayon of Azerbaijan. It has a population of 849.
