= Qadimkücə =

- Location within Azerbaijan
- Coordinates: 38°49′N 48°25′E
- Country: Azerbaijan
- Rayon: Lerik
- Municipality: Nüsomurya
- Time zone: UTC+4 (AZT)
  - Summer (DST): UTC+5 (AZT)

Qadimkücə (also, Qədiməkücə, Qədimküçə, Kadimkyudzha and Khat’ma-Kyudzha) is a village in the Lerik Rayon of Azerbaijan. The village forms part of the municipality of Nüsomurya.
