= Zövnə =

- Municipality
- Location within Azerbaijan
- Coordinates: 38°51′N 48°19′E
- Country: Azerbaijan
- Rayon: Lerik

Population
  - Total: 348
- Time zone: UTC+4 (AZT)
  - Summer (DST): UTC+5 (AZT)

Zövnə (also, Zevna and Zovna) is a village and municipality in the Lerik Rayon of Azerbaijan. It has a population of 348.
