= Livədirgə =

- Municipality
- Location within Azerbaijan
- Coordinates: 38°49′00″N 48°23′29″E
- Country: Azerbaijan
- Rayon: Lerik

Population
  - Total: 1,137
- Time zone: UTC+4 (AZT)
  - Summer (DST): UTC+5 (AZT)

Livədirgə (also, Livədirqə, Leva-Dyr’gya, and Livadirgya) is a village and municipality in the Lerik Rayon of Azerbaijan. It has a population of 1,137. The municipality consists of the villages of Livədirgə and Yuxarı Bilnə.
