= Hıramo =

- Municipality
- Location within Azerbaijan
- Coordinates: 38°47′N 48°25′E
- Country: Azerbaijan
- Rayon: Lerik

Population
  - Total: 154
- Time zone: UTC+4 (AZT)
  - Summer (DST): UTC+5 (AZT)

Hıramo (also, Kharamu and Khyramo) is a village and the least populous municipality in the Lerik Rayon of Azerbaijan. It has a population of 154.
