= Akuşapeştə =

- Location within Azerbaijan
- Coordinates: 38°40′N 48°37′E
- Country: Azerbaijan
- Rayon: Lerik
- Municipality: Siyov
- Time zone: UTC+4 (AZT)
  - Summer (DST): UTC+5 (AZT)

Akuşapeştə (also, Aquşapeştə and Agoshapeshta) is a village in the Lerik Rayon of Azerbaijan. The village forms part of the municipality of Siyov.
