= Cəngəmiran =

- Municipality
- Location within Azerbaijan
- Coordinates: 38°45′35″N 48°26′21″E
- Country: Azerbaijan
- Rayon: Lerik

Population
  - Total: 1,237
- Time zone: UTC+4 (AZT)
  - Summer (DST): UTC+5 (AZT)

Cəngəmiran (Talysh: Çanqəmiyon) is a village and municipality in the Lerik Rayon of Azerbaijan. It has a population of 1,237.
