= Ağqışlaq =

- Municipality
- Location within Azerbaijan
- Coordinates: 38°54′N 48°23′E
- Country: Azerbaijan
- Rayon: Lerik

Population
  - Total: 210
- Time zone: UTC+4 (AZT)
  - Summer (DST): UTC+5 (AZT)

Ağqışlaq (also, Agkyshlak and Ag-Kishlag) is a village and municipality in the Lerik Rayon of Azerbaijan. It has a population of 210.
