= Sipyəreğon =

- Municipality
- Location within Azerbaijan
- Coordinates: 38°47′N 48°32′E
- Country: Azerbaijan
- Rayon: Lerik

Population
  - Total: 202
- Time zone: UTC+4 (AZT)
  - Summer (DST): UTC+5 (AZT)

Sipyəreğon (also, Sipyərəğon, Spyereqon, Sipyəregon, Spiragun, and Syl’yaregon) is a village and municipality in the Lerik Rayon of Azerbaijan. It has a population of 202.
