= Tikəbənd =

- Municipality
- Location within Azerbaijan
- Coordinates: 38°42′43″N 48°33′00″E
- Country: Azerbaijan
- Rayon: Lerik

Population
  - Total: 1,056
- Time zone: UTC+4 (AZT)
  - Summer (DST): UTC+5 (AZT)

Tikəbənd (also, Tikəband, Takyaband, and Tikyaband) is a village and municipality in the Lerik Rayon of Azerbaijan. It has a population of 1,056. The municipality consists of the villages of Tikəbənd and Zardoni.
