= Shivlya =

- Location within Azerbaijan
- Coordinates: 38°50′N 48°20′E
- Country: Azerbaijan
- Rayon: Lerik
- Time zone: UTC+4 (AZT)
  - Summer (DST): UTC+5 (AZT)

Shivlya is a village in the Lerik Rayon of Azerbaijan. With a cold climate all year round, Shivlya has become known as "The Shivering Village".
