= Barzavu =

- Municipality
- Location within Azerbaijan
- Coordinates: 38°45′N 48°28′E
- Country: Azerbaijan
- Rayon: Lerik

Population
  - Total: 637
- Time zone: UTC+4 (AZT)
  - Summer (DST): UTC+5 (AZT)

Barzavu is a village and municipality in the Lerik Rayon of Azerbaijan, a hilly region near the Iranian border. It is a Talysh village in the Talysh region. It is 150 miles south of Baku, and has a population of 637.

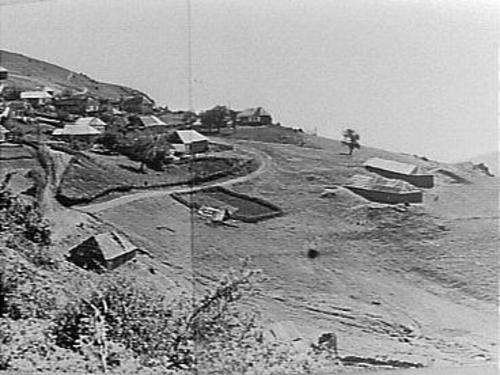
Barzavu in the 1970s

It is known as the hometown of Shirali Muslimov (a.k.a. Mislimov), an ethnic Talysh shepherd who was believed by some to have been the oldest man that ever lived. Though he had no birth certificate, the date of birth given in his passport was 1805, which, if true, would make him 168 when he died in 1973. The area has been studied by experts who agree that centenarians are unusually common in the area.

The area had a major earthquake in 1998. The nearby town of Lerik contains a history museum, a Karabakh War memorial and a hotel.
