= Kürdəsər =

Gürdəsər
- Municipality
- Location within Azerbaijan
- Coordinates: 38°51′46″N 48°26′38″E
- Country: Azerbaijan
- Rayon: Lerik

Population
  - Total: 810
- Time zone: UTC+4 (AZT)
  - Summer (DST): UTC+5 (AZT)

Gürdəsər (Talysh: Qurdəsə) is a village and municipality in the Lerik Rayon of Azerbaijan. It has a population of 810.
