= Lərmərud =

- Municipality
- Location within Azerbaijan
- Coordinates: 38°53′45″N 48°29′05″E
- Country: Azerbaijan
- Rayon: Lerik

Population
  - Total: 1,019
- Time zone: UTC+4 (AZT)
  - Summer (DST): UTC+5 (AZT)

Lərmərud (Talysh: Laməy) is a village and municipality in the Lerik Rayon of Azerbaijan. It has a population of 1,019.
