= Hovil =

- Municipality
- Location within Azerbaijan
- Coordinates: 38°40′N 48°37′E
- Country: Azerbaijan
- Rayon: Lerik

Population
  - Total: 260
- Time zone: UTC+4 (AZT)
  - Summer (DST): UTC+5 (AZT)

Hovil (also, Govyl’ and Khovil’) is a village and municipality in the Lerik Rayon of Azerbaijan. It has a population of 260.
