= Qosələr =

Village in Lerik District, Azerbaijan

Coordinates: 38.695278°N 48.412222°E

Qosələr is a village in the municipality of Şonacola in the Lerik Rayon of Azerbaijan.
