= Qırxıncı =

Village in Lerik District, Azerbaijan

Coordinates: 38.8175°N 48.508056°E

Qırxıncı is a village in the municipality of Burkandul in the Lerik District of Azerbaijan.
