= Verkhniy Gyaduk =

- Location within Azerbaijan
- Coordinates: 38°36′N 48°23′E
- Country: Azerbaijan
- Rayon: Lerik
- Time zone: UTC+4 (AZT)
  - Summer (DST): UTC+5 (AZT)

Verkhniy Gyaduk (also, Gyaduk and Gyadyuk) is a village in the Lerik Rayon of Azerbaijan.
