= Anzolu =

- Municipality
- Location within Azerbaijan
- Coordinates: 38°41′N 48°29′E
- Country: Azerbaijan
- Rayon: Lerik

Population
  - Total: 395
- Time zone: UTC+4 (AZT)
  - Summer (DST): UTC+5 (AZT)

Anzolu (Talysh: Anzoli) is a village and municipality in the Lerik Rayon of Azerbaijan. It has a population of 395. The municipality consists of the villages of Anzolu and Təngəbin.
