= Çayrud =

- Municipality
- Location within Azerbaijan
- Coordinates: 38°42′47″N 48°30′20″E
- Country: Azerbaijan
- Rayon: Lerik

Population
  - Total: 1,780
- Time zone: UTC+4 (AZT)
  - Summer (DST): UTC+5 (AZT)

Çayrud (Talysh: Cayru) is a village and municipality in the Lerik Rayon of Azerbaijan. It has a population of 1,980. All of population belong to Talysh nation.
