= Divağac =

- Location within Azerbaijan
- Coordinates: 38°41′32″N 48°22′49″E
- Country: Azerbaijan
- Rayon: Lerik
- Municipality: Şonacola
- Time zone: UTC+4 (AZT)
  - Summer (DST): UTC+5 (AZT)

Divağac (also, Divagach) is a village in the Lerik Rayon of Azerbaijan. The village forms part of the municipality of Şonacola.
