= Hovari =

- Location within Azerbaijan
- Coordinates: 38°42′N 48°25′E
- Country: Azerbaijan
- Rayon: Lerik
- Municipality: Şonacola
- Time zone: UTC+4 (AZT)
  - Summer (DST): UTC+5 (AZT)

Hovari (also, Həveri, Govari and Goveri) is a village in the Lerik Rayon of Azerbaijan. The village forms part of the municipality of Şonacola. The village contains a necropolis dating from the late Bronze Age to early Iron Age.
