= Davıdonu =

- Municipality
- Location within Azerbaijan
- Coordinates: 38°55′55″N 48°29′40″E
- Country: Azerbaijan
- Rayon: Lerik

Population
  - Total: 717
- Time zone: UTC+4 (AZT)
  - Summer (DST): UTC+5 (AZT)

Davıdonu (also, Davidonu) is a village and municipality in the Lerik Rayon of Azerbaijan. It has a population of 717. The municipality consists of the villages of Davıdonu, Vamazğon, and Naftonu.
