= Qələbin =

- Municipality
- Location within Azerbaijan
- Coordinates: 38°41′34″N 48°35′24″E
- Country: Azerbaijan
- Rayon: Lerik

Population
  - Total: 330
- Time zone: UTC+4 (AZT)
  - Summer (DST): UTC+5 (AZT)

Qələbin (also, Kalabin, Kalyabin, and Khalabin) is a village and municipality in the Lerik Rayon of Azerbaijan. It has a population of 330.
