= Andurma =

- Municipality
- Location within Azerbaijan
- Coordinates: 38°42′58″N 48°28′05″E
- Country: Azerbaijan
- Rayon: Lerik

Population
  - Total: 577
- Time zone: UTC+4 (AZT)
  - Summer (DST): UTC+5 (AZT)

Andurma is a village and municipality in the Lerik Rayon of Azerbaijan. It has a population of 577. The municipality consists of the villages of Andurma and Piyəküçə.
