= Vələçola =

- Location within Azerbaijan
- Coordinates: 38°47′15″N 48°25′51″E
- Country: Azerbaijan
- Rayon: Lerik
- Time zone: UTC+4 (AZT)
  - Summer (DST): UTC+5 (AZT)

Vələçola (also, Vela-Chela and Velechola) is a village in the Lerik Rayon of Azerbaijan.
