= Jindi =

- Village
- Location within Azerbaijan
- Coordinates: 38°44′N 48°27′E
- Country: Azerbaijan
- Rayon: Lerik
- Time zone: UTC+4 (AZT)
  - Summer (DST): UTC+5 (AZT)

Jindi is a village in the municipality of Monidigah in the Lerik Rayon of Azerbaijan.
