= Kekonu =

- Location within Azerbaijan
- Coordinates: 38°47′38″N 48°18′58″E
- Country: Azerbaijan
- Rayon: Lerik
- Municipality: Bilavər
- Time zone: UTC+4 (AZT)
  - Summer (DST): UTC+5 (AZT)

Kekonu is a village in the Lerik Rayon of Azerbaijan. The village forms part of the municipality of Bilavər.
