= Zeynəko =

Village in Lerik District, Azerbaijan

Coordinates: 38°41′N 48°39′E

Zeynəko is a village in the municipality of Bobla in the Lerik Rayon of Azerbaijan.
