= Dəstər =

- Municipality
- Location within Azerbaijan
- Coordinates: 38°38′48″N 48°36′22″E
- Country: Azerbaijan
- Rayon: Lerik

Population
  - Total: 362
- Time zone: UTC+4 (AZT)
  - Summer (DST): UTC+5 (AZT)

Dəstər (also, Daster, Dastyr’, and Dostar) is a village and municipality in the Lerik Rayon of Azerbaijan. It has a population of 362.

== Notable natives ==
- Ali Huseynov — Full Cavalier of the Order of Glory.
