= Hücü =

- Location within Azerbaijan
- Coordinates: 38°43′58″N 48°35′30″E
- Country: Azerbaijan
- Rayon: Lerik
- Time zone: UTC+4 (AZT)
  - Summer (DST): UTC+5 (AZT)

Hücü (also, Hüzü, Gidzhu, and Gudzhu) is a village in the Lerik Rayon of Azerbaijan.
