= Dangyaband =

- Location within Azerbaijan
- Coordinates: 38°46′N 48°40′E
- Country: Azerbaijan
- Rayon: Lerik
- Time zone: UTC+4 (AZT)
  - Summer (DST): UTC+5 (AZT)

Dangyaband (or Dengyavin) is a village in the Lerik Rayon of Azerbaijan.
