= Rvarud =

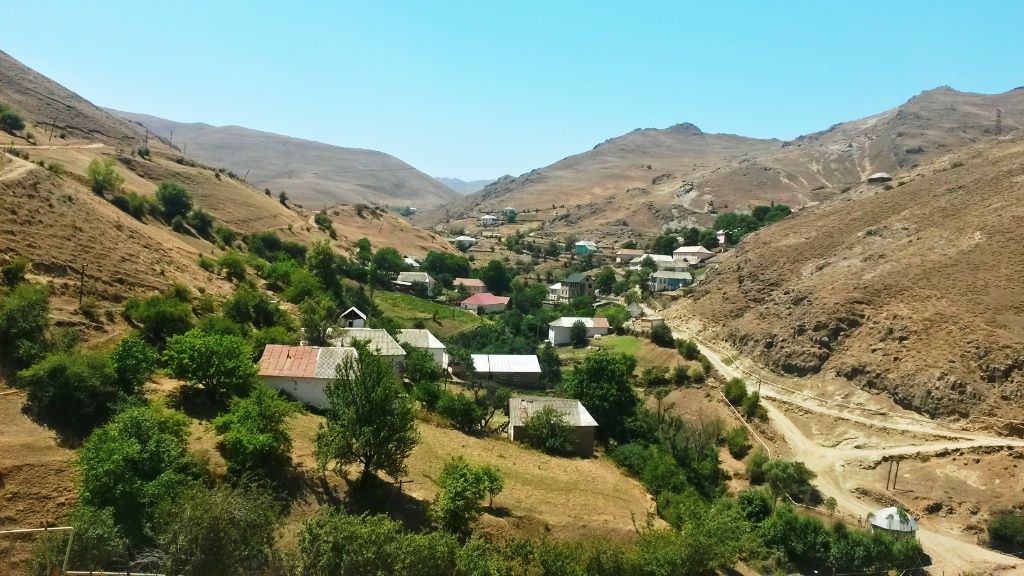
Rvarud
- Municipality
- Location within Azerbaijan
- Coordinates: 38°41′43″N 48°29′31″E
- Country: Azerbaijan
- Rayon: Lerik

Population
  - Total: 820
- Time zone: UTC+4 (AZT)
  - Summer (DST): UTC+5 (AZT)

Rvarud (also, Rüvarud, Revarut, and Rivarud) is a village and municipality in the Lerik Rayon of Azerbaijan. It has a population of 820.
