= Zardoni =

Village in Lerik, Azerbaijan

- Location within Azerbaijan
- Coordinates: 38°43′N 48°32′E
- Country: Azerbaijan
- Rayon: Lerik
- Municipality: Tikəbənd
- Time zone: UTC+4 (AZT)
  - Summer (DST): UTC+5 (AZT)

Zardoni (also, Zardonu) is a village in the Lerik Rayon of Azerbaijan. The village forms part of the municipality of Tikəbənd.
