= Naftonu =

Human settlement in Azerbaijan

Naftonu is a village in the municipality of Davıdonu in the Lerik Rayon of Azerbaijan.
