= Khush =

- Location within Azerbaijan
- Coordinates: 38°47′N 48°36′E
- Country: Azerbaijan
- Rayon: Lerik
- Time zone: UTC+4 (AZT)
  - Summer (DST): UTC+5 (AZT)

Khush is a village in the Lerik Rayon of Azerbaijan.
