= Təngəbin =

- Location within Azerbaijan
- Coordinates: 38°41′N 48°28′E
- Country: Azerbaijan
- Rayon: Lerik
- Municipality: Anzolu
- Time zone: UTC+4 (AZT)
  - Summer (DST): UTC+5 (AZT)

Təngəbin (Talysh: Tanqəbin) is a village in the Lerik Rayon of Azerbaijan. The village forms part of the municipality of Anzolu.
