= Monidigah =

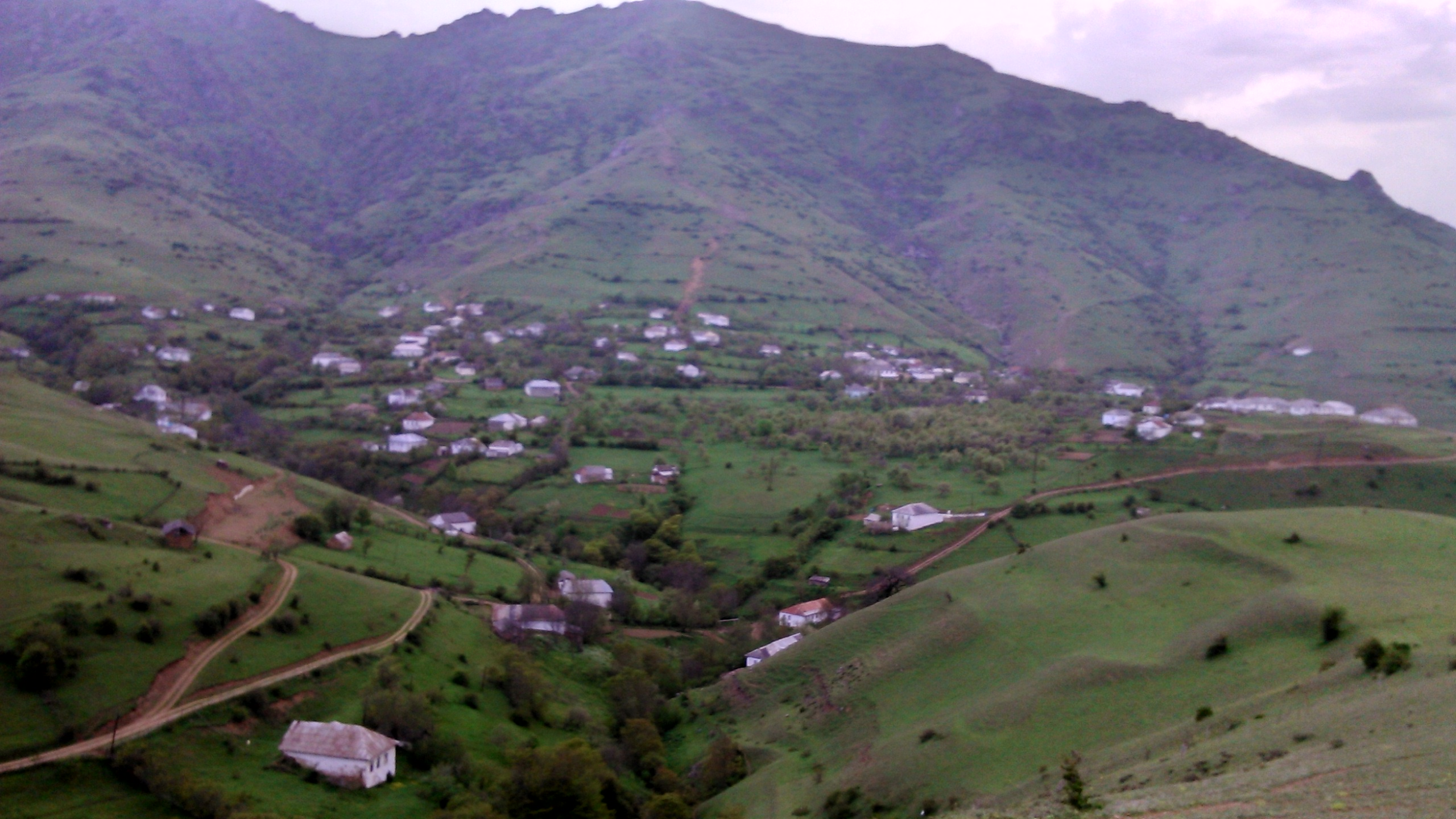
Monidigah
- Municipality
- Location within Azerbaijan
- Coordinates: 38°43′34″N 48°27′13″E
- Country: Azerbaijan
- Rayon: Lerik

Population
  - Total: 1,183
- Time zone: UTC+4 (AZT)
  - Summer (DST): UTC+5 (AZT)

Monidigah (also, Mondygya and Monidigya) is a village and municipality in the Lerik Rayon of Azerbaijan. It has a population of 1,183. The municipality consists of the villages of Monidigah, Pendi, and Jindi.

== Mondigo ==
- Monidigah at GEOnet Names Server
