= Yuxarı Bilnə =

- Location within Azerbaijan
- Coordinates: 38°48′N 48°25′E
- Country: Azerbaijan
- Rayon: Lerik
- Municipality: Livədirgə
- Time zone: UTC+4 (AZT)
  - Summer (DST): UTC+5 (AZT)

Yuxarı Bilnə (also, Verkhnyaya Bilinya and Yukhary Bil’nya) is a village in the Lerik Rayon of Azerbaijan. The village forms part of the municipality of Livədirgə.
