= Sorsçay =

Village in Lerik District, Azerbaijan

Coordinates: 38°47′N 48°19′E

Soruşçay is a village in the municipality of Nüravud in the Lerik Rayon of Azerbaijan.
