= Bilavər =

- Municipality
- Location within Azerbaijan
- Coordinates: 38°50′25″N 48°20′05″E
- Country: Azerbaijan
- Rayon: Lerik

Population
  - Total: 688
- Time zone: UTC+4 (AZT)
  - Summer (DST): UTC+5 (AZT)

Bilavər (also, Biləvər, Billidyul’, and Bilyavar) is a village and municipality in the Lerik Rayon of Azerbaijan.

== Demography ==
It has a population of 688.

== Geography ==
The municipality consists of the villages of Bilavər, Kekonu, and Osyedərə.
