= Aşağı Bradi =

- Location within Azerbaijan
- Coordinates: 38°38′N 48°36′E
- Country: Azerbaijan
- Rayon: Lerik
- Time zone: UTC+4 (AZT)
  - Summer (DST): UTC+5 (AZT)

Aşağı Bradi (also, Ashagy Burady and Borady) is a village in the Lerik Rayon of Azerbaijan.
