= Aşağı Bilnə =

- Location within Azerbaijan
- Coordinates: 38°48′N 48°27′E
- Country: Azerbaijan
- Rayon: Lerik
- Municipality: Noda
- Time zone: UTC+4 (AZT)
  - Summer (DST): UTC+5 (AZT)

Aşağı Bilnə (also, Ashagy Bil’nya and Nizhnyaya Bilinya) is a village in the Lerik Rayon of Azerbaijan. The village forms part of the municipality of Noda.
