= Shirali Muslimov =

Talysh origin Azerbaijani shepherd (died 1973)

Shirali Muslumov
- Shirali Muslimov in 1970, photo by Nikolai Ignatiev/TASS
- Born: March 26, 1805 (claimed); Barzavu, Lerik District, Talysh Khanate
- Died: September 2, 1973; Barzavu, Lerik District, Azerbaijan SSR, Soviet Union
- Occupation: Shepherd
- Known for: Claimed longevity
- Children: 23

Shirali Farzali oghlu Muslumov, also spelled as Muslimov (Azerbaijani: Şirəli Fərzəli oğlu Müslümov, pronounced [ʃiɾæˈli mysˈlymov]; Russian: Ширали Фарзали оглы Муслимов; Talysh: Širali Farzali zoa Müslümov; allegedly March 26, 1805? – September 2, 1973) was an Azerbaijani shepherd of Talysh ethnicity from the village of Barzavu in the Lerik District of Azerbaijan, a mountainous area near the Iranian border. He claimed to be the oldest person who ever lived when he died on September 2, 1973, at the alleged age of 168. In 1966, the studio Azerbaijanfilm shot a documentary film about him, Shirali Descended from the Mountain.

== Life ==
A brief description of Muslimov's life was first published in an article for Life magazine in 1966. The article alleged that Muslimov was born in Barzavu in 1805 and that he was given a copper plate with his birth date and name inscribed. The plate was lost and was never verified but Muslimov was issued a passport in 1939. The article also alleged that Muslimov was never sick, worked full days and ate a diet consisting of rice soup, sheep milk, boiled meat, sweet tea and yogurt. Muslimov claimed that he could recall incidents from 150 years ago such as bandits attacking his village. In the absence of accurate records such as a birth certificate, gerontologists have disputed Muslimov's age claims.

Muslimov's story was picked up in 1973 by National Geographic, which told that on occasion he still rode horseback and tended an orchard planted in the 1870s. National Geographic later recanted on the claim. According to his obituary, published by Time, when Muslimov was 136 years old, he married 57-year-old Khatum-Khanum (1884–1988), and on the same year a baby girl was born to his family. This is the most advanced age in the whole world history which saw a man to become a father. His father lived for 110 years, mother - 90, and his last - third wife - 104 years outliving her husband for 15 years.

The only evidence in favour of Muslimov's age claim is a passport that listed his birthdate. Muslimov had no known birth certificate.

== Fame ==
The case of Muslimov became known in 1963, when a young photojournalist of TASS, Kalman Kaspiev, went to Barzavu to interview him. The story was picked up by the Soviet press, by National Geographic, and by the Danone company, which for promotional reasons suggested that the longevity of Muslumov was linked to a diet of dairy, and yogurt in particular. This interest changed the life of the small Azerbaijani village, which was connected to the electricity grid and started receiving radio and television broadcasts.

In the 1970s, Westerners were made aware of these extreme claims of longevity in Azerbaijan and elsewhere in the Caucasus region when a U.S. Danone yogurt commercial invoked some of these people to suggest that the secret of their long lives lay in the frequent consumption of yogurt. However, the idea that peoples of the Caucasus region live longer because of eating yogurt is a myth not supported by any factual evidence.

== See also ==
- Li Ching-Yuen
- Longevity claims
