= Lerik, Azerbaijan =

Lerik
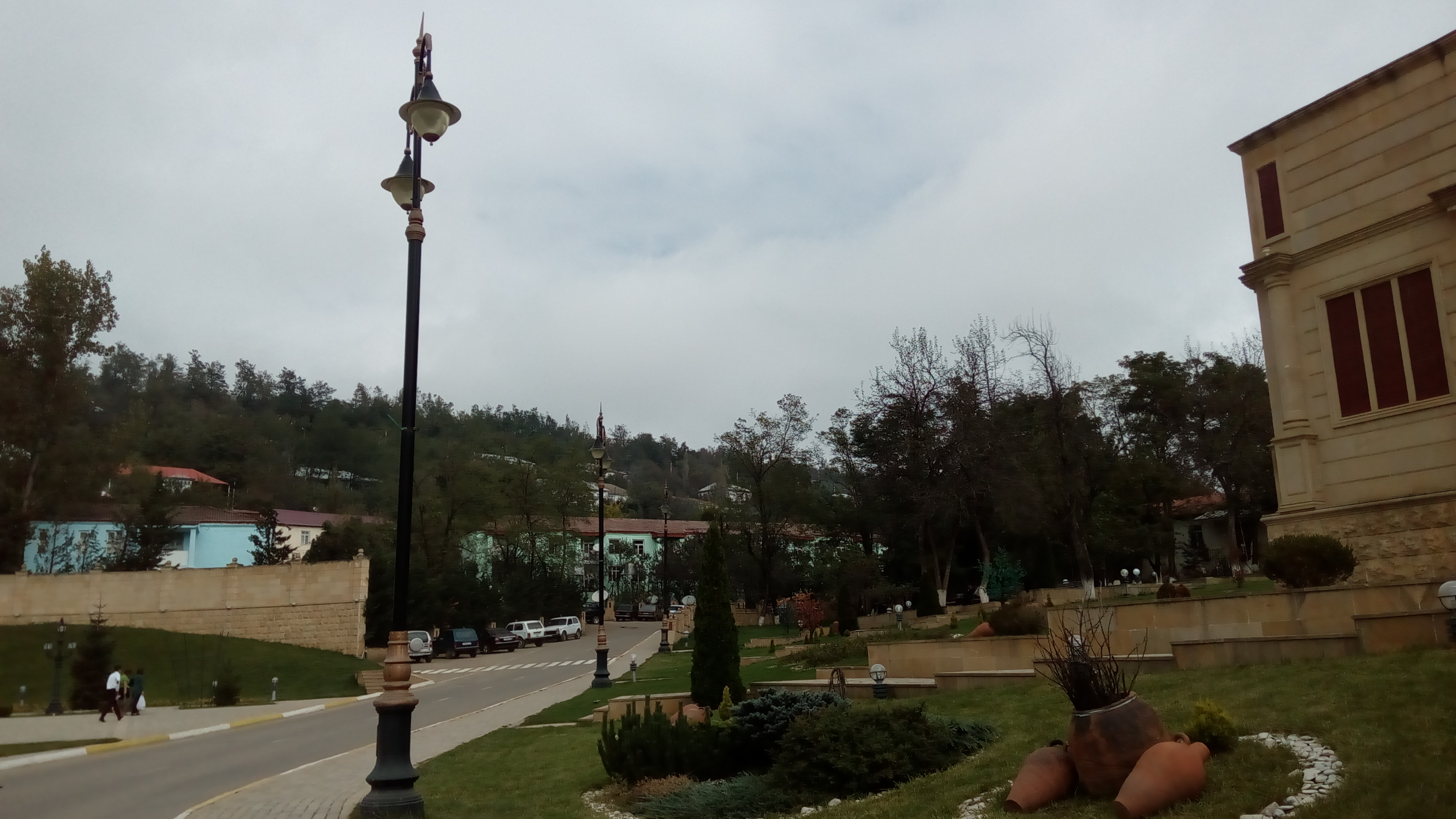

- Location within Azerbaijan
- Coordinates: 38°46′31″N 48°24′55″E
- Country: Azerbaijan
- District: Lerik
- Established: 1916
- Elevation: 1,096 m (3,596 ft)

Population (2021)
  - Total: 8,657
- Time zone: UTC+4 (AZT)
- Area code: +994 157

Lerik is the capital city of Lerik District in the southern area of Azerbaijan not far from the Iranian border. It is located in the Talysh Mountains, a northwestern subrange of the Alborz (Elburz) mountain range. The majority of the population is Talysh.

== History ==
Lerik is considered one of the ancient settlements of Azerbaijan. There are imprints of ancient people who lived in the caves. Nowadays there are settlement imprints which belong to bronze-Neolithic ages.

Lerik became a center of Zuvand Region of Azerbaijan SSR. In 1930 this region was renamed as Lerik.

According to the census back in 1939, the main population of Lerik were Talysh people.

The city is also said to be the actual Bazz Fortress, where Babak Khorramdin actually resided according to rumors.

== Historical monuments ==
One of the main sights near Lerik is the Buzeyir cave. In the 19th century Jacques de Morgan discovered human imprints belonging to the Neolithic era.

== Population ==
Lerik city population 1939 (approximately after 10 years of rename by Azerbaijan SSR):

Ethnic group	Quantity	Percentage
Talysh	996	68.7%
Azerbaijani	303	20.9%
Russian	107	7.4
Armenian	11	0.8%
Other	32	2.2%
Total	1 449	100%

Demographics now (according to 2009 census)

Ethnic group	Quantity	Percentage
Talysh	72228	96.92%
Azerbaijani	2281	3.06%
Russian	11	0.01%
Other	2	0.00%

The vast majority of the city's population are Talysh, while the rest are Azerbaijanis and other ethnicities.

== Climate ==
Climate data for Lerik(normals for 1937-1965 and 1977-1991 periods)
Month	Jan	Feb	Mar	Apr	May	Jun	Jul	Aug	Sep	Oct	Nov	Dec	Year
Average precipitation mm (inches)	38.9 (1.53)	40.2 (1.58)	56.1 (2.21)	54.3 (2.14)	59.5 (2.34)	36.8 (1.45)	15.2 (0.60)	36.4 (1.43)	64.5 (2.54)	82.9 (3.26)	53.1 (2.09)	39.5 (1.56)	577.4 (22.73)
Average precipitation days (≥ 0.01 in)	7.6	8.9	12.1	11.9	12.6	8.1	4.4	6.5	10.8	13.6	11.0	8.6	116.1
Source: NCEI

== Zuvand State Reserve ==
The Zuvand State Reserve was created in Lerik region to maintain the flora and fauna. The reserve covers 40.3 hectares of land. National academy has settled Botanical Research center, where active observations and researches are made. These forests are habitats for wolves, bears, foxes, wild cats, boars and other animals.

== Gallery ==
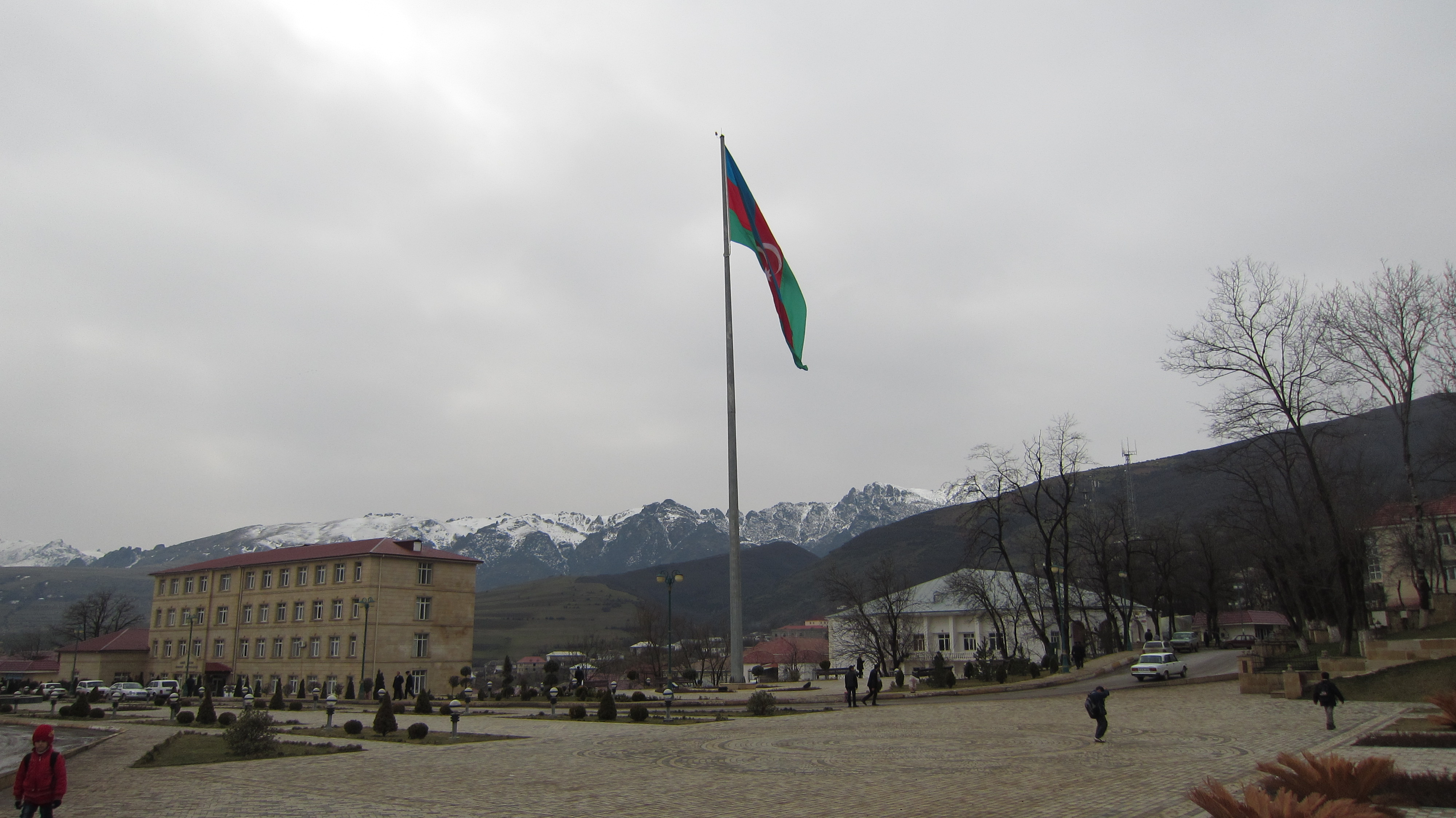
Center of Lerik

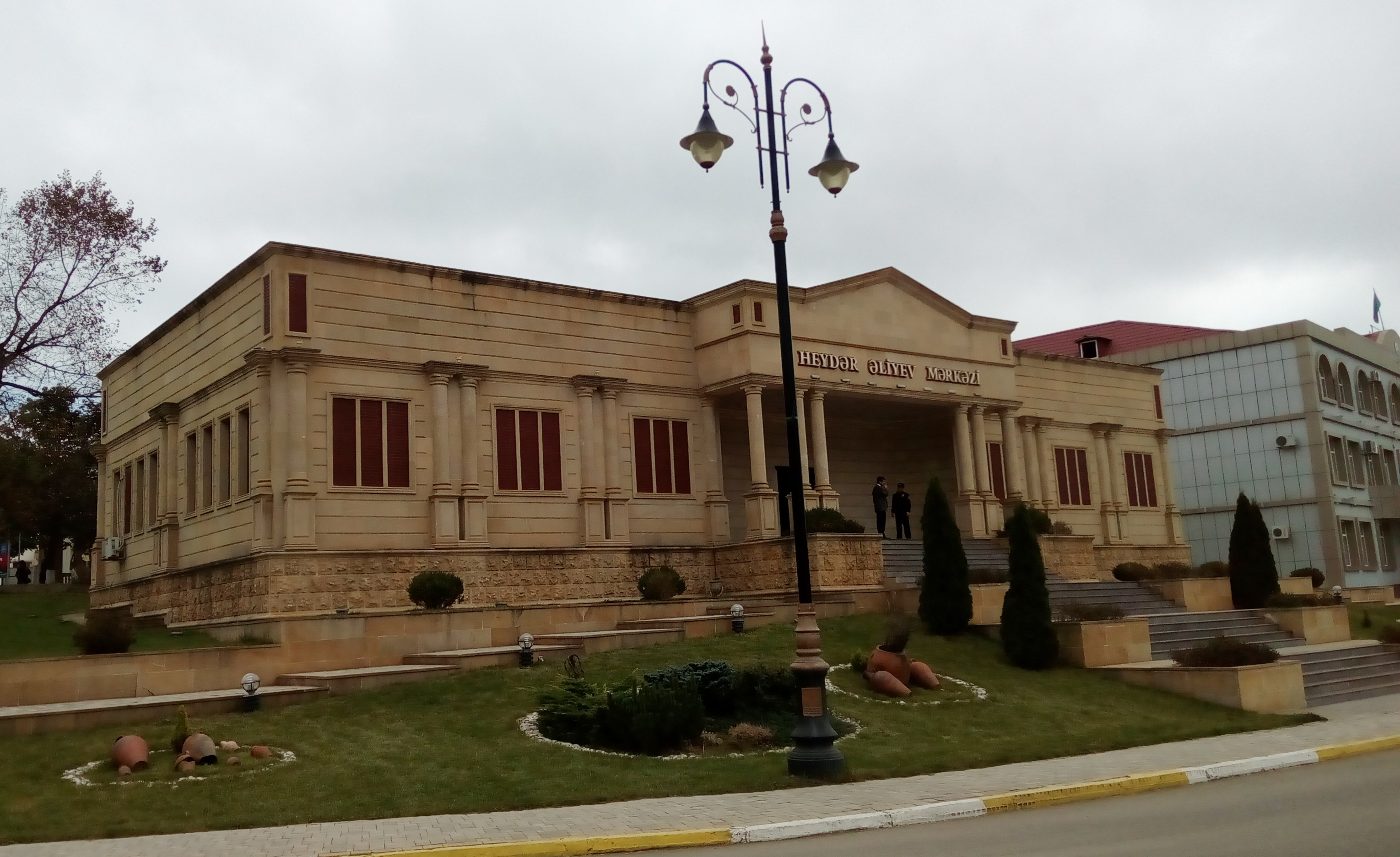
Haydar Aliyev Center

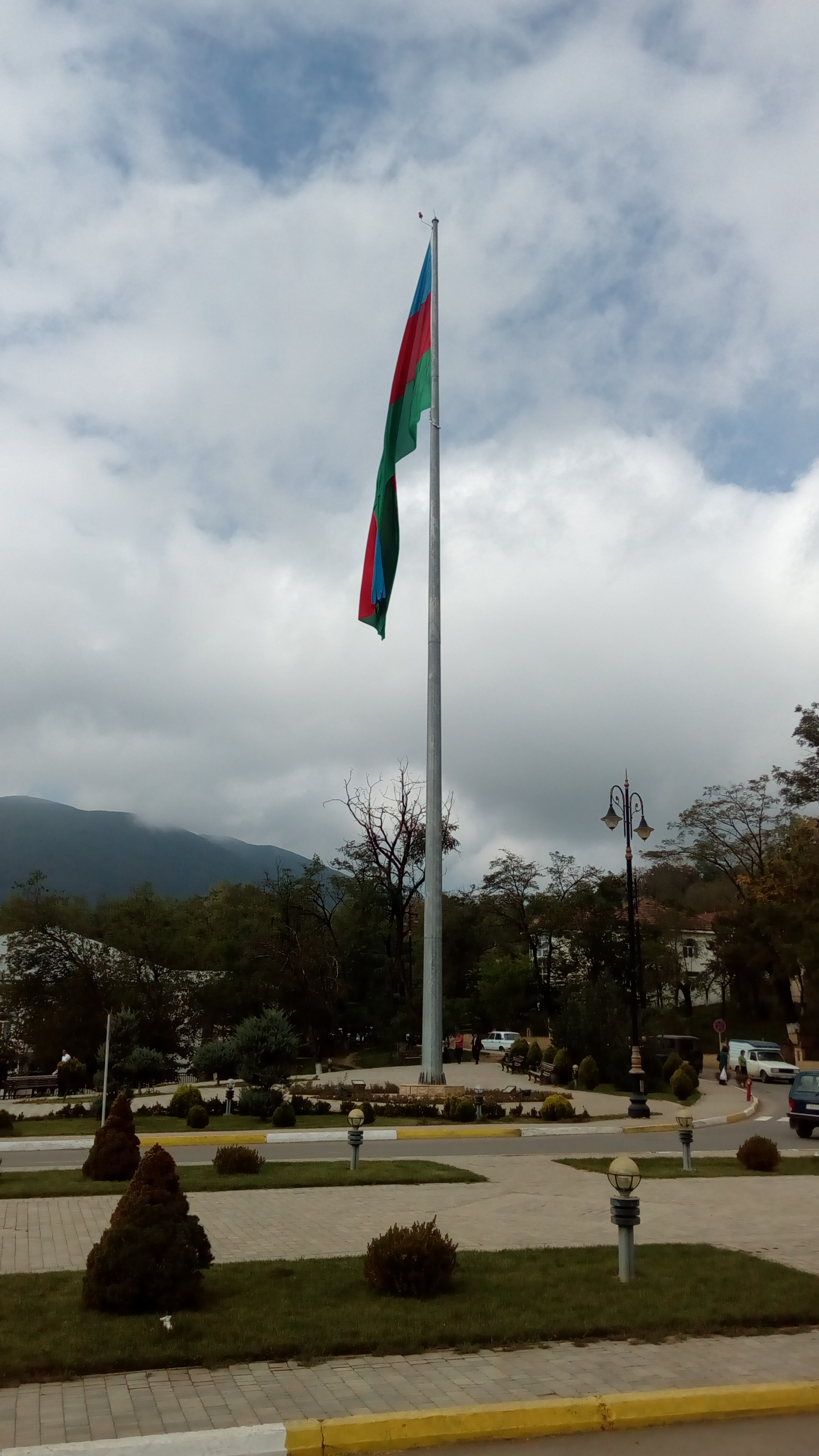
Flag of Azerbaijan in Lerik

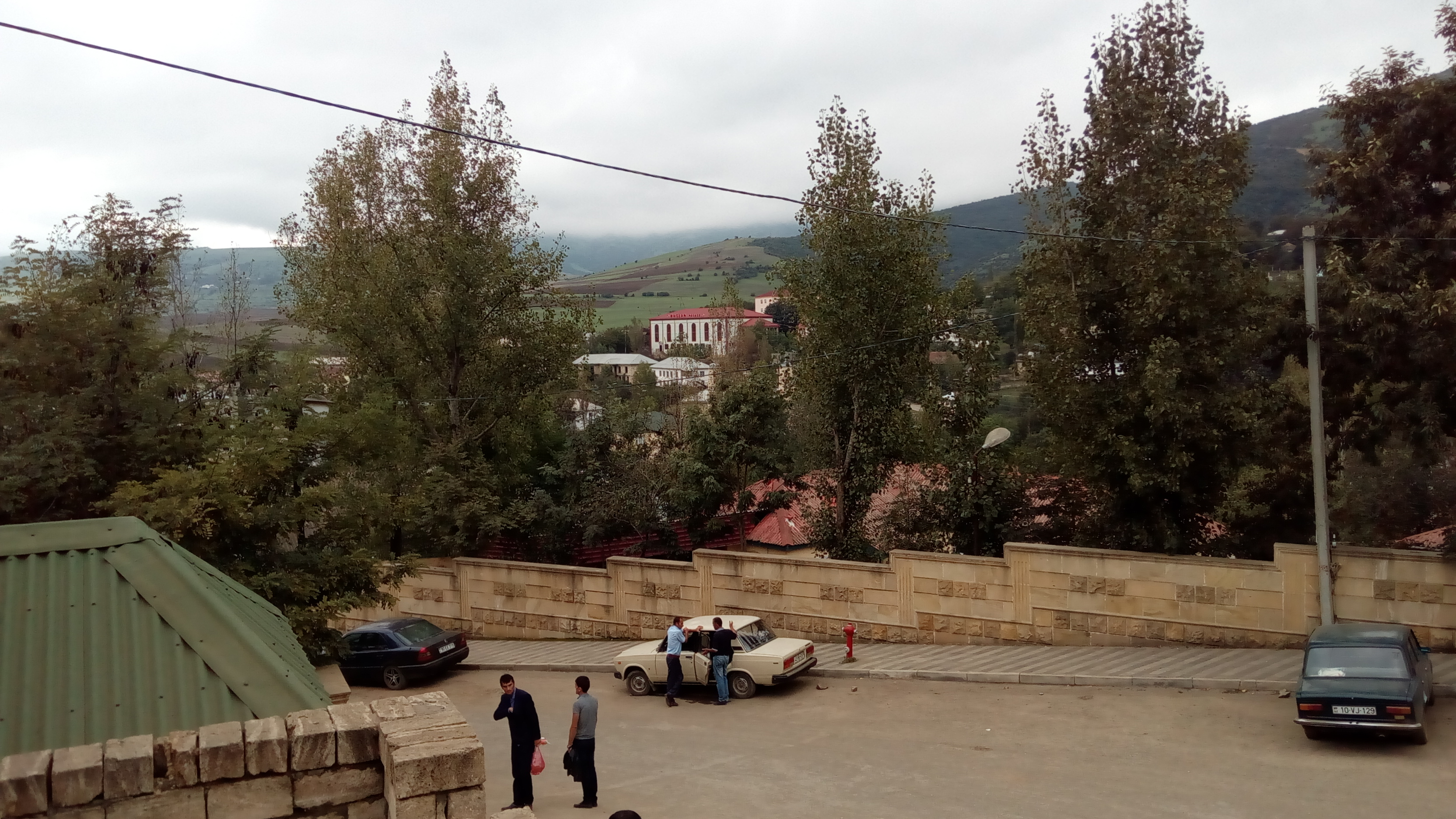
A street of Lerik

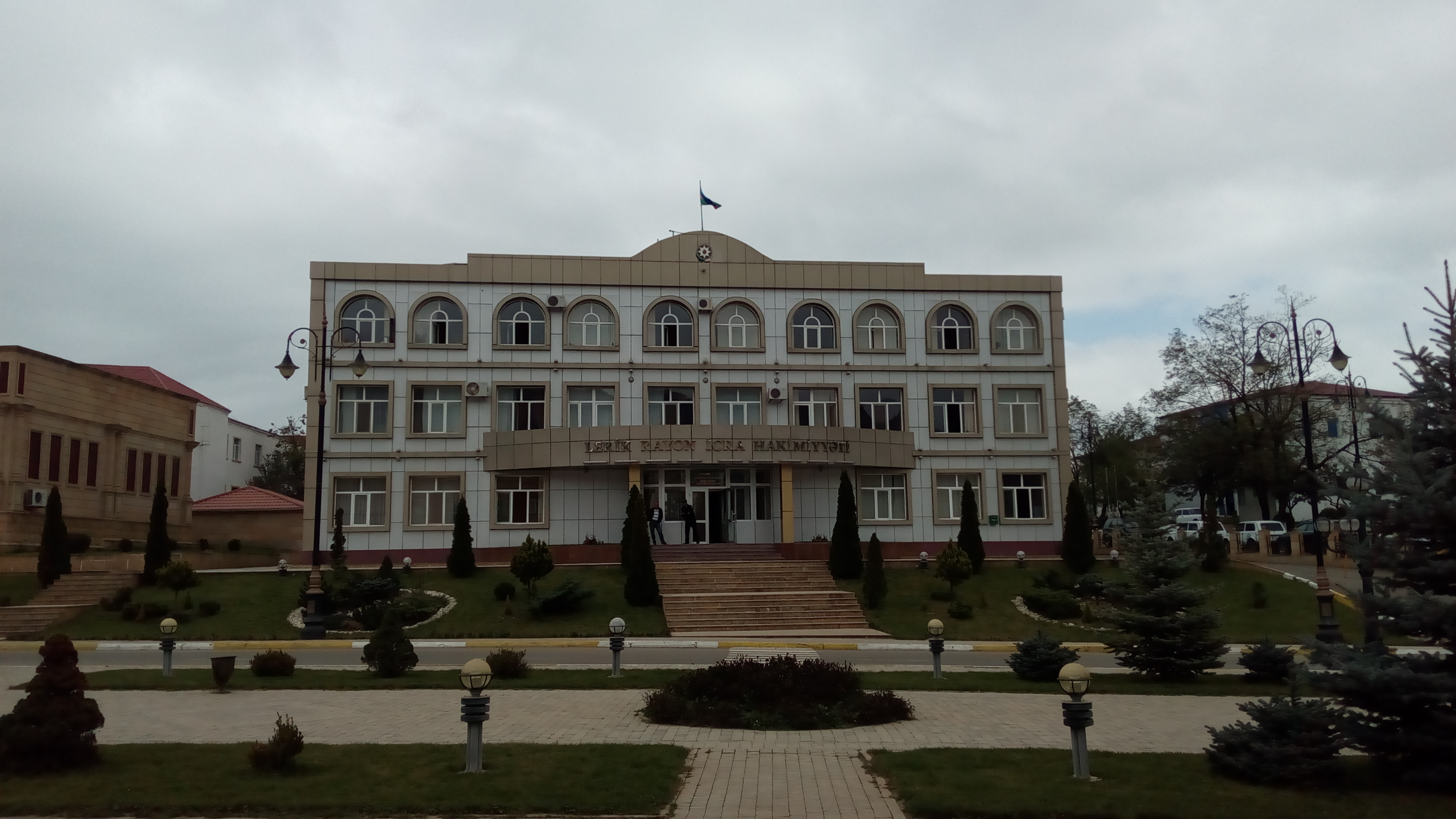
Lerik District Executive Power
