= Lerik District =

District in southeastern Azerbaijan

Coordinates: 38°47′00″N 48°25′00″E

Lerik District Lerik rayonu
- District
- Map of Azerbaijan showing Lerik District
- Country: Azerbaijan
- Region: Lankaran-Astara
- Established: 8 August 1930
- Capital: Lerik
- Settlements: 162

Government
  - Governor: Akbar Abbasov

Area
  - Total: 1,084 km^{2} (419 sq mi)

Population (2020)
  - Total: 87,000
  - Density: 80/km^{2} (210/sq mi)
- Time zone: UTC+4 (AZT)
- Postal code: 4300
- Website: lerik-ih.gov.az

Lerik District (Azerbaijani: Lerik rayonu) is one of the 66 districts of Azerbaijan. It is located in the southeast of the country and belongs to the Lankaran-Astara Economic Region. The district borders the districts of Yardimli, Masally, Lankaran, Astara and the Ardabil Province of Iran. Its capital and largest city is Lerik. As of 2020, the district had a population of 87,000. It is located between the Talysh Mountains and the agricultural plain of the Lankaran Lowland.

== History ==
Lerik district was established in August 1930. It was called "Zuvand District" until January 1938. 29 municipalities operate in the district. The district includes a city and 162 villages with a total area of 1084 square kilometer. In accordance with the presidential decree dated June 13, 2008, the settlement of Lerik was granted the status of a city.

The territory of the Lerik district is one of the oldest settlements in Azerbaijan. The territory of the Lerik district features some ancient caves believed to date back to the Bronze Age. These caves are located in the foothills of the mountains.

Different items belonging to the Stone Age were found in the Lerik district. The cave called "Buzeyir" is the oldest settlement in the territory of Azerbaijan. In the 18th-19th centuries, French archaeologists Jacques de Morgan, K. Schaffer and his brother Henri called this territory "archaeological paradise" during archaeological excavations. Morgan conducted archaeological excavations at the Gizilbashlar cemetery in the village of Veri of Lerik.

Professor Asadulla Jafarov, head of the Archeology and Ethnography Department of the History Institute of the National Academy of Sciences of Azerbaijan, conducted scientific researches in the territory of Lerik region and for the first time discovered an ancient human camp belonging to the Middle Paleolithic Age in the Buzeyir cave.

== People ==
Ethnic groups in Lerik (2019)
1. Talysh (76.6%)
2. Azerbaijani (23.3%)
3. Others (0.09%)

Lerik is mainly famous for the longevity of some of its citizens. It is known for myths of human longevity; a man named Shirali Baba Muslimov, born in the village of Barzavu, who was reported by the Guinness Book of Records to have been aged 168 when he died and was believed to have lived between 1805 and 1973. The majority of the district's population is Talysh and Azerbaijani.

=== Population ===
Population of the district by the year (at the beginning of the year, thsd. persons)
Population	2000	2001	2002	2003	2004	2005	2006	2007	2008	2009	2010	2011	2012	2013	2014	2015	2016	2017	2018	2019	2020	2021
Lerik region	64,3	65,3	66,2	67,3	68,3	69,6	70,9	72,0	73,2	74,3	75,2	76,4	77,5	78,7	79,7	80,8	81,9	82,8	83,8	84,7	85,8	86,6
urban population	6,8	6,8	6,9	7,0	7,1	7,2	7,2	7,2	7,2	7,3	7,3	7,5	7,9	8,0	8,0	8,1	8,2	8,3	8,4	8,5	8,6	8,7
rural population	57,5	58,5	59,3	60,3	61,2	62,4	63,7	64,8	66,0	67,0	67,9	68,9	69,6	70,7	71,7	72,7	73,7	74,5	75,4	76,2	77,2	77,9

== Travel ==
Located in Lerik are a local history museum and the Karabakh war memorial, located between the parade ground and the modest city hall.

Lerik can be reached from Lankaran using the A323 road. It is a very scenic route along the Lankaran river and the Hirkan National Park. Buses run regularly to Lankaran and Baku. The maximum annual precipitation in Lerik and the Talysh Mountains is between 1,600 mm to 1,800 mm, which along the Lankaran Lowland is the highest in the country.

== Geographical position ==
The Lerik region territory is surrounded by the Talysh mountain range. Lerik region is bordered by Yardimli in the south and south-west, in the north-east Lankaran, in the north-west Masalli, and in the south-east Astara. The Talysh mountain range extends along the border with the Islamic Republic of Iran and in the north beyond the Peshtasar and Bouravar mountain ranges. The length of the border is 49.5 kilometers with the Islamic Republic of Iran.

The Zuvand (Diabar) Trench is located between the Talysh and Buddhist ridges. The Komurgoy (2492 m) and Gizyurd (2433 m) are the highest peaks in the Talysh Range. It mostly consists of Paleogene volcanogenic-sedimentary rocks. The region covers 40.3 thousand hectares of forest.

The Zuvand State Reserve is located in Zuvand. The Botanical Research Center of the National Academy of Sciences studies of the Fauna and Flora is operating here.

== Climate ==
Climate data for Lerik(normals for 1937-1965 and 1977-1991 periods)
Month	Jan	Feb	Mar	Apr	May	Jun	Jul	Aug	Sep	Oct	Nov	Dec	Year
Average precipitation mm (inches)	38.9 (1.53)	40.2 (1.58)	56.1 (2.21)	54.3 (2.14)	59.5 (2.34)	36.8 (1.45)	15.2 (0.60)	36.4 (1.43)	64.5 (2.54)	82.9 (3.26)	53.1 (2.09)	39.5 (1.56)	577.4 (22.73)
Average precipitation days (≥ 0.01 in)	7.6	8.9	12.1	11.9	12.6	8.1	4.4	6.5	10.8	13.6	11.0	8.6	116.1
Source: NCEI

== Economy ==
The district is mainly occupied by mountainous relief, where the population is mainly engaged in agriculture. Annually 2790 tons of grains from 1454 hectares are planted in the region.

== Education ==
There are 107 secondary schools in the district. About 1269 teachers work in schools.

== Health ==
Lerik Region Central Hospital provides medical care to 82 thousand people.

== Cultural heritage ==
There are 27 architectural monuments of local importance, memorial monuments, and 78 decorative monuments in the territory of the Lerik district. A historical museum, as well as the museum of "Longevity", and an art gallery operates in the city.

Ancient mansion "Qizyurdu"l, Baba Isa tomb in the village of Mondigah, Mausoleum of Khalifa Zechariah, Mosque in Lulekaran village (19th century) Jabir Mausoleum (12th–14th centuries) and so on are the most famous monuments in the region.

Among historical places, the Boy and Girl castles are very famous in the territory. These castles were constructed with the purpose of defense. In one legend it is said that these castles were the houses of ancient Albanians. There are still Albanian cemeteries near the castles.

During the Safavid rule, Shah Ismayil also sent his faithful people to the Lerik region. The Babagil mausoleum, which turned into a sanctuary, is the hallmark of those times.

There are 11 cultural centers, 64 libraries (one central library in the city, one children's library), 55 clubs, 1 painting gallery, 2 primary music schools in the district.

303,700 copies of the political, artistic and scientific literature have been collected in the branches of the centralized library system of the district. 24,000 people benefit from this fund.

== Notable people ==
- Valeh Muslumov, National Hero of Azerbaijan

== Gallery ==
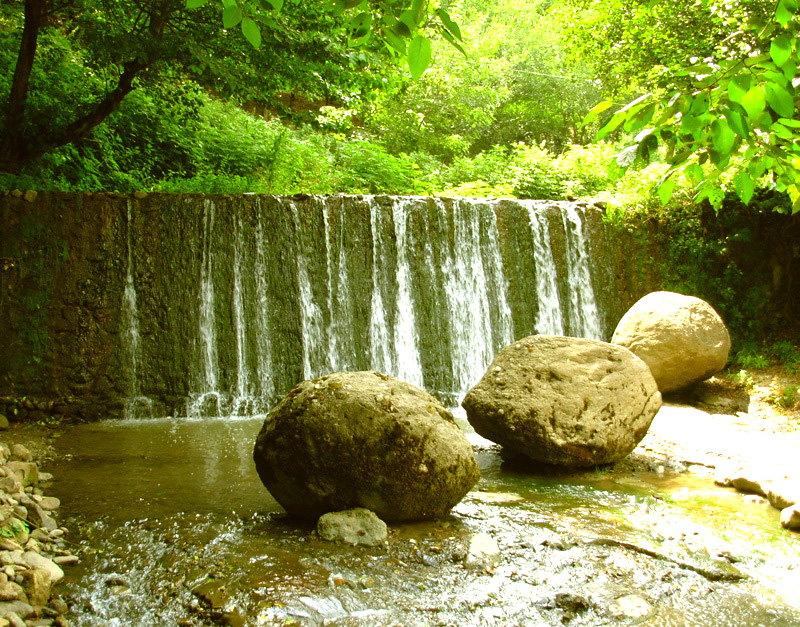

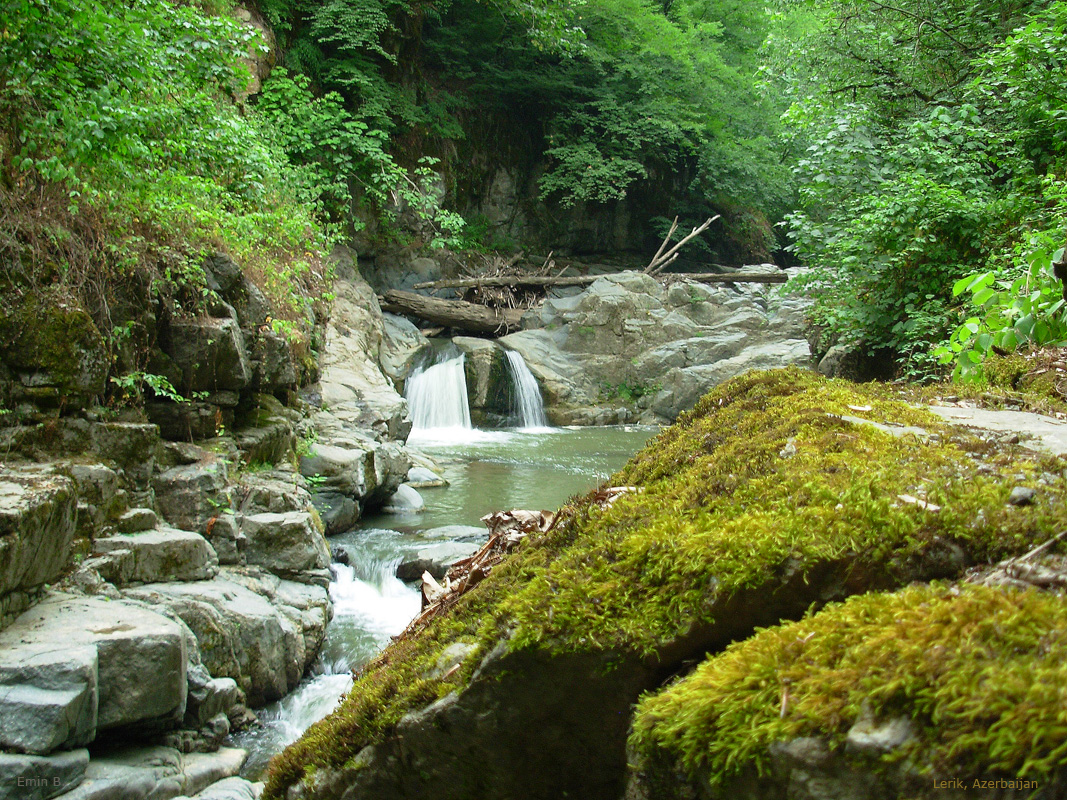

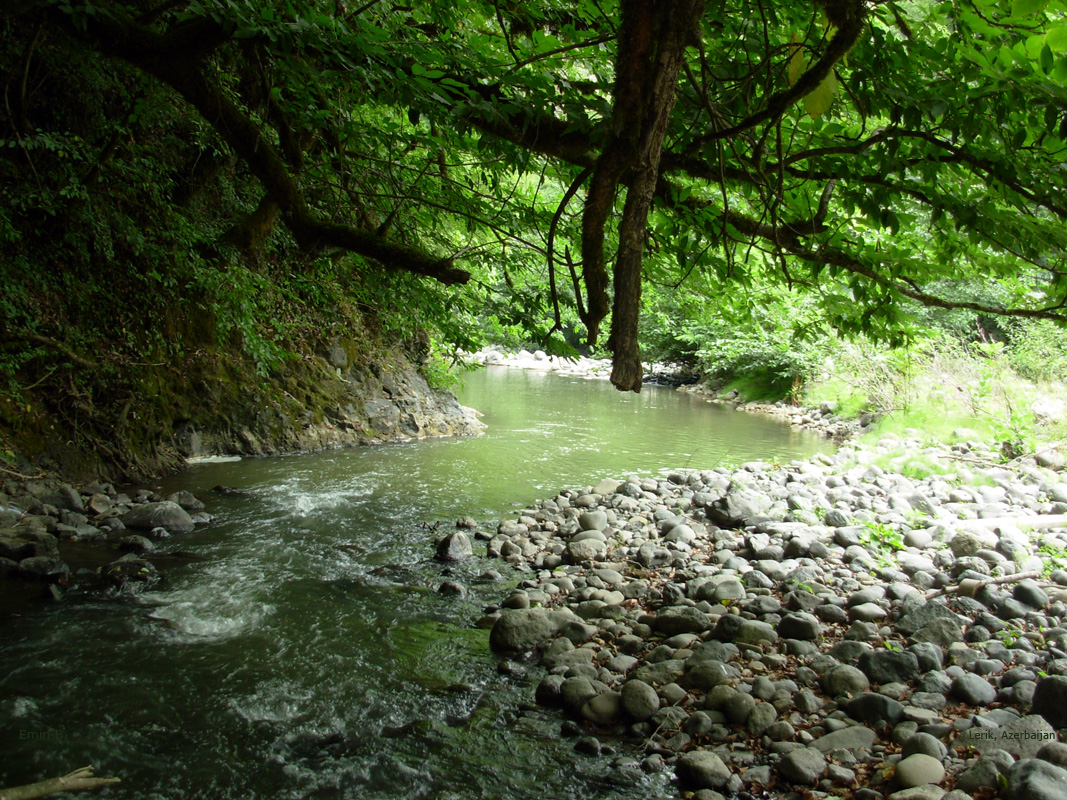

== See also ==
- Caspian Hyrcanian mixed forests - ecoregion that covers the Lerik District.
