= Prehistoric Caucasus =

Human habitation of the Caucasus region before written records

The Caucasus region, on the gateway between Southwest Asia and Europe, plays a pivotal role in the peopling of Eurasia, possibly as early as during the Homo erectus expansion to Eurasia, in the Upper Paleolithic peopling of Europe, and again in the re-peopling Mesolithic Europe following the Last Glacial Maximum, and in the expansion associated with the Neolithic Revolution.

== Lower to Middle Paleolithic ==
Dmanisi skull 5, found in Dmanisi, Georgia, is among the earliest Homo erectus fossils, dated to 1.8 Ma.

- Azykh Cave has remnants of the pre-Acheulean, estimated at 0.7 Ma.
- Mousterian
- Mezmaiskaya cave (70–40 ka)

== Upper Paleolithic to Epipaleolithic ==
- Dzudzuana cave (30 ka)
- Satsurblia cave (24 ka)
- Damjili Cave
- Dash Salakhly (20 ka)
- Gobustan National Park (20–5 ka)
- Trialetian (16–8 ka)

== Neolithic to Iron Age ==
Neolithic:

- Shulaveri-Shomu culture (8–6 ka)
- Metsamor site (6 ka)

Bronze Age:

- Maykop culture
- Leyla-Tepe culture
- Kura-Araxes culture
- Trialeti culture
- Jar-Burial Culture
- Kurgan culture
- Khojaly–Gadabay culture (c. 1300 – 600 BC)
- Kingdom of Arme-Shupria (c. 1300 – 1190 BC)
- Colchian culture (c. 2700 – 700 BC)
- Koban culture (c. 1100 – 400 BC)

The South Caucasus gradually enters the historical period following the Bronze Age collapse, see history of the Caucasus

- Kingdom of Diauehi (12th – 9th century BC)
- Nairi (1114 – 860 BC)
- Kingdom of Urartu (c. 860 – 590 BC)
- Neo-Assyrian Empire (911 – 609 BC)

== Genetic history ==
Language groups in the Caucasus have been found to have a close correlation to genetic ancestry.

A genetic study in 2015 by Jones et al. identified a previously unidentified lineage, which was dubbed Caucasian Hunter-Gatherer (CHG). The study detected a split between CHG and so-called "Western European Hunter-Gatherer" (WHG) lineages, about 45,000 years ago, the presumed time of the original peopling of Europe. CHG separated from the "early Anatolian farmers" (EAF) lineage later, at 25,000 years ago, during the Last Glacial Maximum. (CHG was extrapolated from, among other sources, the genomes of two fossils from western Georgia – one about 13,300 years old (Late Upper Paleolithic) and the other 9,700 years (Mesolithic), which were compared to the 13,700 year-old Bichon man genome (found in Switzerland).

A genetic study in 2020 analyzing samples from Klin-Yar communities, including the Koban culture, found that the ancient population had one sample of paternal Haplogroup D-Z27276. Most other paternal lineages in the study were Haplogroup J1 and Haplogroup G-M285.

== See also ==
- Prehistoric Georgia
- Prehistoric Armenia
- Prehistoric Azerbaijan
- Scythia
- Peoples of the Caucasus
- Proto-Northwest Caucasian language
- Caucasic languages
- Dené-Caucasian
