= Prehistoric Armenia =

Human habitation in Armenia before written records

Prehistoric Armenia refers to the history of the region that would eventually be known as Armenia, covering the period of the earliest known human presence in the Armenian Highlands from the Lower Paleolithic more than 1 million years ago until the Iron Age and the emergence of Urartu in the 9th century BC, the end of which in the 6th century BC marks the beginning of Ancient Armenia.

== Paleolithic ==
The Armenian Highlands have been settled by human groups from the Lower Paleolithic to modern days. The first human traces are supported by the presence of Acheulean tools, generally close to the obsidian outcrops more than 1 million years ago. Middle and Upper Paleolithic settlements have also been identified such as at the Hovk 1 cave and the Trialetian culture.

The most recent and important excavation is at the Nor Geghi 1 Stone Age site in the Hrazdan river valley. Thousands of 325,000 year-old artifacts may indicate that this stage of human technological innovation occurred intermittently throughout the Old World, rather than spreading from a single point of origin (usually hypothesized to be Africa), as was previously thought.

== Neolithic ==
The sites of Aknashen and Aratashen in the Ararat plain region are believed to belong to the Neolithic period. The Mestamor archaeological site, located to the southwest of Armenian village of Taronik in the Armavir Province, also shows evidence of settlement starting from the Neolithic era. The name 'Armenia' is written for the first time in history in the 24th-23rd centuries B.C. in the Mesopotamian cuneiform inscriptions in the form 'Armani', while in the text of the same period discovered in Ebla (Syria) Armenia is called 'Armi'.

The Shulaveri-Shomu culture of the central Transcaucasus region is one of the earliest known prehistoric cultures in the area, carbon-dated to roughly 6000 - 4000 BC. The Shulaveri-Shomu culture in the area was succeeded by the Bronze Age Kura-Araxes culture, dated to the period of ca. 3400 - 2000 BC.

== Bronze Age ==
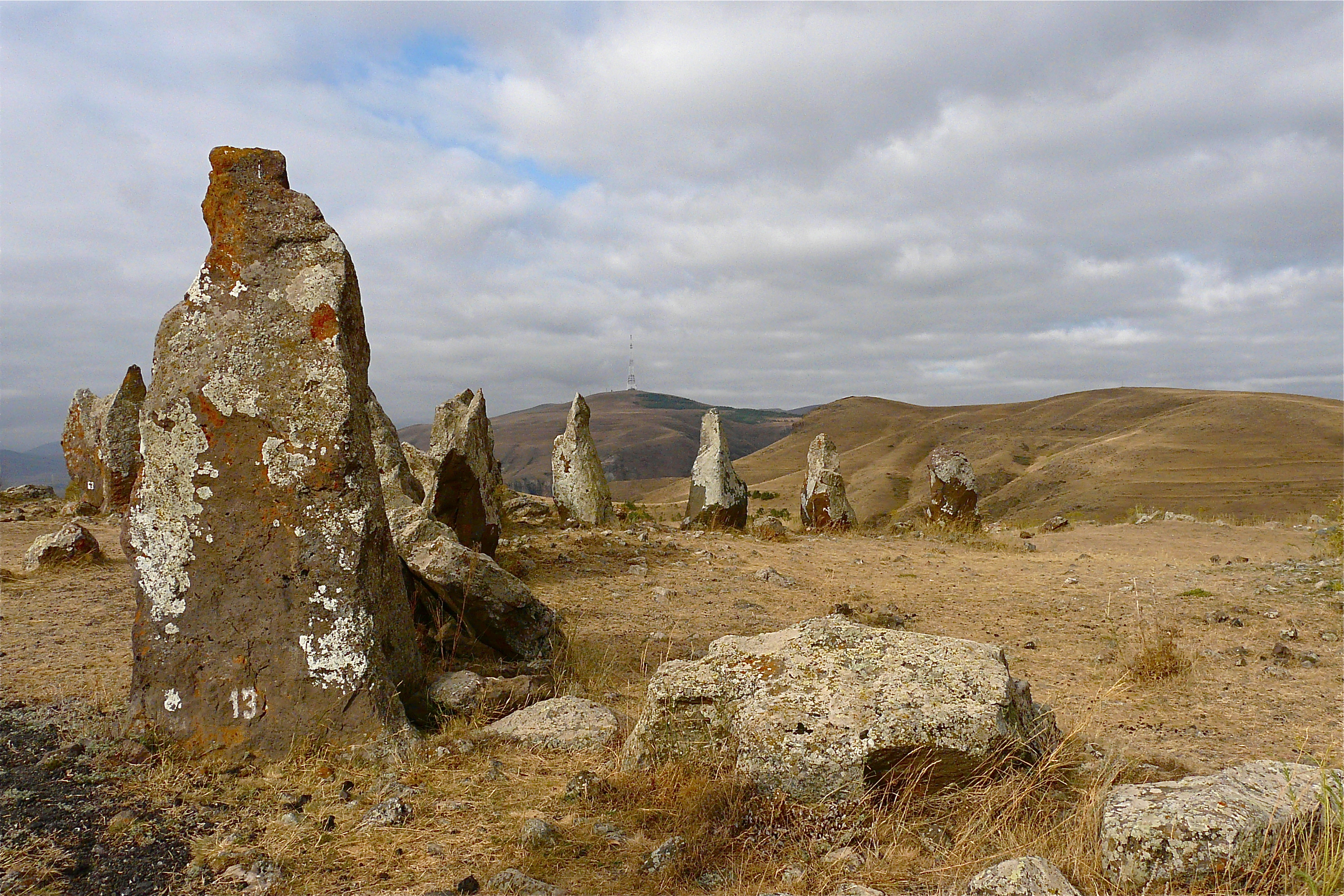
Bronze Age burial site Zorats Karer (also known as Karahunj).

An early Bronze-Age culture in the area is the Kura-Araxes culture, assigned to the period between c. 4000 and 2200 BC. The earliest evidence for this culture is found on the Ararat plain; thence it spread to Georgia by 3000 BC (but never reaching Colchis), proceeding westward and to the south-east into an area below the Urmia basin and Lake Van.

From 2200 BC to 1600 BC, the Trialeti-Vanadzor culture flourished in Armenia, southern Georgia, and northeastern Turkey. It has been speculated that this was an Indo-European culture. Other possibly related cultures were spread throughout the Armenia Highlands during this time, namely in the Aragats and Lake Sevan regions.

Early 20th-century scholars suggested that the name "Armenia" may have possibly been recorded for the first time on an inscription which mentions Armanî (or Armânum) together with Ibla, from territories conquered by Naram-Sin (2300 BC) identified with an Akkadian colony in the current region of Diyarbekir; however, the precise locations of both Armani and Ibla are unclear. Some modern researchers have placed Armani (Armi) in the general area of modern Samsat, and have suggested it was populated, at least partially, by an early Indo-European-speaking people. Today, the Modern Assyrians (who traditionally speak Neo-Aramaic, however, not Akkadian) refer to the Armenians by the name Armani. Thutmose III of Egypt, in the 33rd year of his reign (1446 BC), mentioned as the people of "Ermenen", claiming that in their land "heaven rests upon its four pillars". Armenia is possibly connected to Mannaea, which may be identical to the region of Minni mentioned in The Bible. However, what all these attestations refer to cannot be determined with certainty, and the earliest certain attestation of the name "Armenia" comes from the Behistun Inscription (c. 500 BC).

The earliest form of the word "Hayastan", an endonym for Armenia, might possibly be Hayasa-Azzi, a kingdom in the Armenian Highlands that was recorded in Hittite records dating from 1500 to 1200 BC.

Between 1200 and 800 BC, much of Armenia was united under a confederation of tribes, which Assyrian sources called Nairi ("Land of Rivers" in Assyrian").

== Iron Age ==
The main object of early Assyrian incursions into Armenia was to obtain metals. The iron-working age followed that of bronze everywhere, opening a new epoch of human progress. Its influence is noticeable in Armenia, and the transition period is well marked. Tombs whose metal contents are all of bronze are of an older epoch. In most of the cemeteries explored, both bronze and iron furniture were found, indicating the gradual advance into the Iron Age.

== See also ==
- Armenian hypothesis
- Hayasa-Azzi
- Hayk
- Karahunj
- Mount Ararat
- Nairi (people)
- Prehistoric Asia
- Prehistory of Anatolia
- Prehistoric Georgia
