= Baba-Dervish settlement =

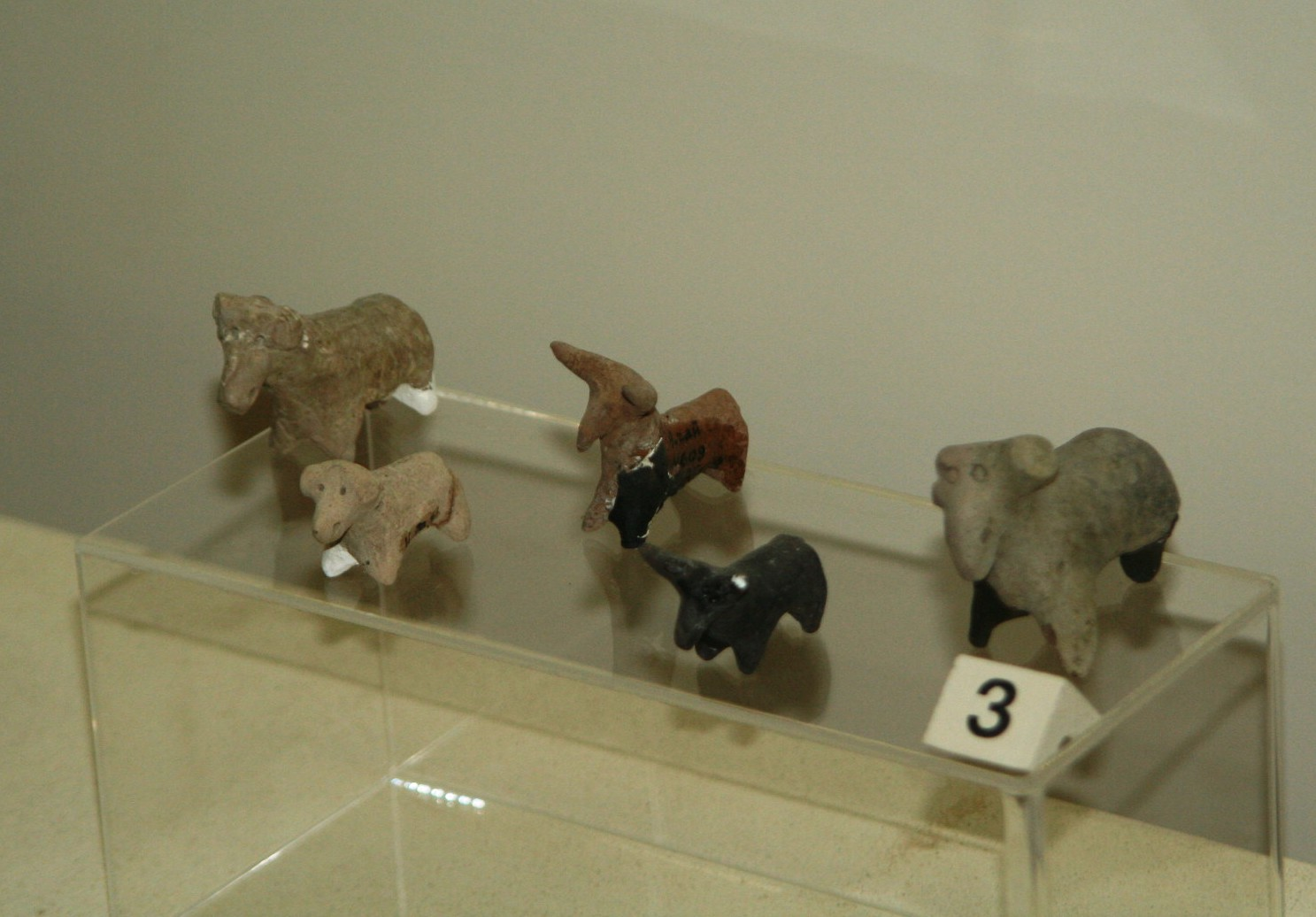
Clay figures of animals from Kultepe-1 and Babadervis. National Museum of History of Azerbaijan

Baba-Dervish (azərb. Baba-Dərviş) is an ancient settlement in the western part of Qazax District in Azerbaijan. It is located on the south bank of the Aghstafa river, on the outskirts of Khanlyglar village. Archaeological excavations conducted from 1958 to 1966 revealed three cultural layers here. This settlement is included in the list of archaeological monuments of world significance by the government of Azerbaijan.

Baba-Dervish settlement consists of a series of 5 hills. According to recent research, the settlement goes back to the Neolithic period from the beginning up to the third quarter of the 6th millennium B.C.

== Archaeological excavations ==
In 1958, the Gazakh archaeological expedition of the Institute of History started to carry out research in the area Baba-Dervish settlement for the first time. In the autumn of 1960, the excavation area was 60 sq.m; in 1961–1962 – 600 sq.m.

Archaeological artefacts found in 1965 were handed over to the Archaeological fund for permanent protection in 1977 (Act Number 1-10; 77–133).

As a result of archaeological excavations, there were several residential buildings also belonging to the Khojaly–Gadabay culture - an archaeological culture of the 12th-7th centuries BC, which was discovered on the territory of the settlement.

Moreover, there were human and animal figures, the remains of wheels made of clay, and a large quantity of ceramic items dating from 2300 to 2200 BC found in this area.

In 1966 there was a catacomb-type grave discovered here. There were clay pots, an iron knife, part of a wooden loom, bronze needles and et cetera along with the corpse in the grave.

== Cultural layers ==
The lower cultural layer dates back to the 6th Millennium BC. There were round semi-underground houses, grain-grinding stones, needle, awl, bones of various animals, etc. were found in this layer during the archaeological excavations.

There were round houses built of raw brick, pottery with geometric patterns and patterns in the shape of birds, mangals, animal figures, hearths for melting metal, the remains of barley and wheat, significant construction remains, pieces of plaster etc found in the middle layer which dates back to the III Millennium BC.

Furthermore, there was a stone stele embroidered with a double spiral found in the central part of the excavation area. There is a possibility that this stele used to be a part of a single complex with a ritual hearth which played the role of a sanctuary.

The upper layer dates from the end of the II to the beginning of the I Millennium BC and is represented by quadrangular houses, household wells and jugs, various household utensils, clay seals, mangals, bronze arrowheads, bull sculptures, iron objects, etc.

The bottom layer is represented by monuments of Shulaveri-Shomu culture, medium one — Kura–Araxes culture and the upper one — Khojaly–Gadabay culture. The results of archaeological excavations have shown that the population of the Baba-Dervish settlement was engaged in cattle breeding and agriculture, pottery, sewing, and metalworking.

== See also ==
- Azerbaijan
- History of Azerbaijan
- Archaeology of Azerbaijan
- Bronze and Iron Age Azerbaijan

== Literature ==
1. Alekperov A., Studies of Azerbaijan's archeology and ethnography, Baku, 1960.
2. Aliev V., The Painted Pottery Culture of the Bronze Age in Azerbaijan, Baku, 1977
3. Chernykh E. Ancient Metallurgy in the USSR: The Early Metal Age, Archive – 1992 – 335 p.
4. Idem, Archeology of Azerbaijan, Baku, 1986
5. Ismailov G. Archeological studies of the ancient Baba-Dervish settlement, Baku, 1977.
6. Kushnareva, K. The Southern Caucasus in Prehistory: Stages of Cultural and Socioeconomic Development from the Eighth to the Second Millennium B.C., Museum of Archaeology – 1997 – 279 p.
7. Lang D. The Ancient Caucasus. From the prehistoric settlements of Anatolia to the Christian kingdoms of the early middle Ages – 2016
8. Zardabli I. Ethnic and political history of Azerbaijan: from ancient times to the present day – 2018 – 572 p.
