= Shomu-tepe =

- Şomutəpə
- Shomutepe
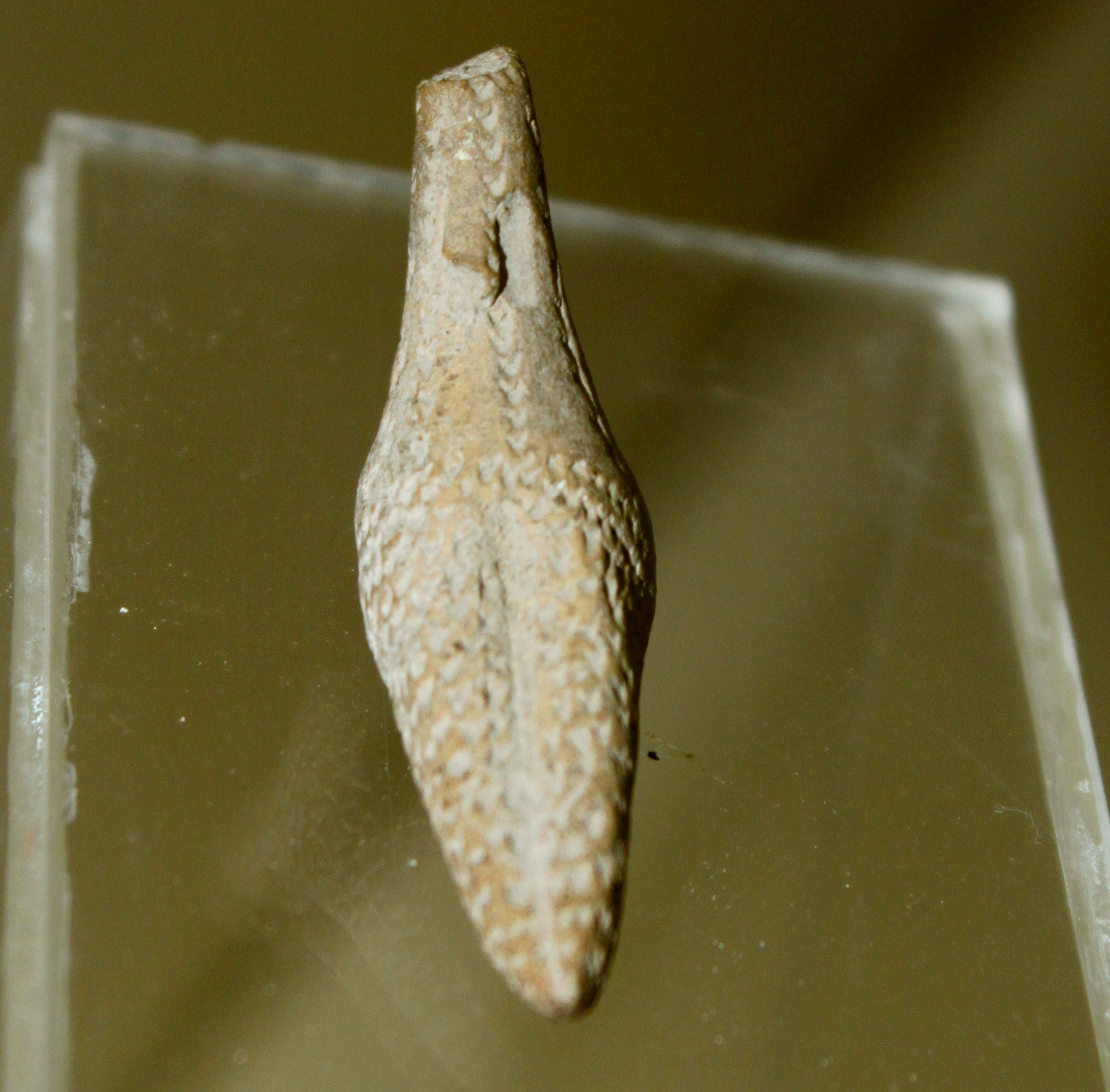
- A female statuette from Gargalar tepesi. Shomu Tepe culture. National Museum of History of Azerbaijan

- Location within Azerbaijan
- 41.124440°N 45.458330°E
- Periods: Neolithic
- Cultures: Shulaveri-Shomu culture
- Location: Azerbaijan
- Region: Agstafa District

Shomu-tepe (Şomutəpə) is an ancient settlement in the Agstafa District of Azerbaijan. The Neolithic Shulaveri-Shomu culture that formed in the Southern Caucasus is connected with the name of this monument.

The settlement is located in the northern suburb of the modern city of Agstafa.

== Research ==
During the 1960s, I. G. Narimanov, was the first to recognize a new culture that he named 'Shomu', after he excavated this site on the outskirts of Agstafa. This is now known as Shulaveri-Shomu culture. In 1961–1964, he carried out research in the area of 400 square meters in the residential area of Agstafa.

== Settlement ==
The thickness of the cultural level at the settlement varies from 1 to 2.5 m.

The inhabitants of Shomutape lived in small round houses built of unbaked plano-convex bricks. The ceiling of the house was supported by a pole buried in the floor. Houses had one and sometimes two entrances. The maximum diameter of these residential buildings was 3.7 m. Later, Narimanov identified two types of circular buildings here, small with a diameter around 2 m, and large with a diameter around 3.5 m.

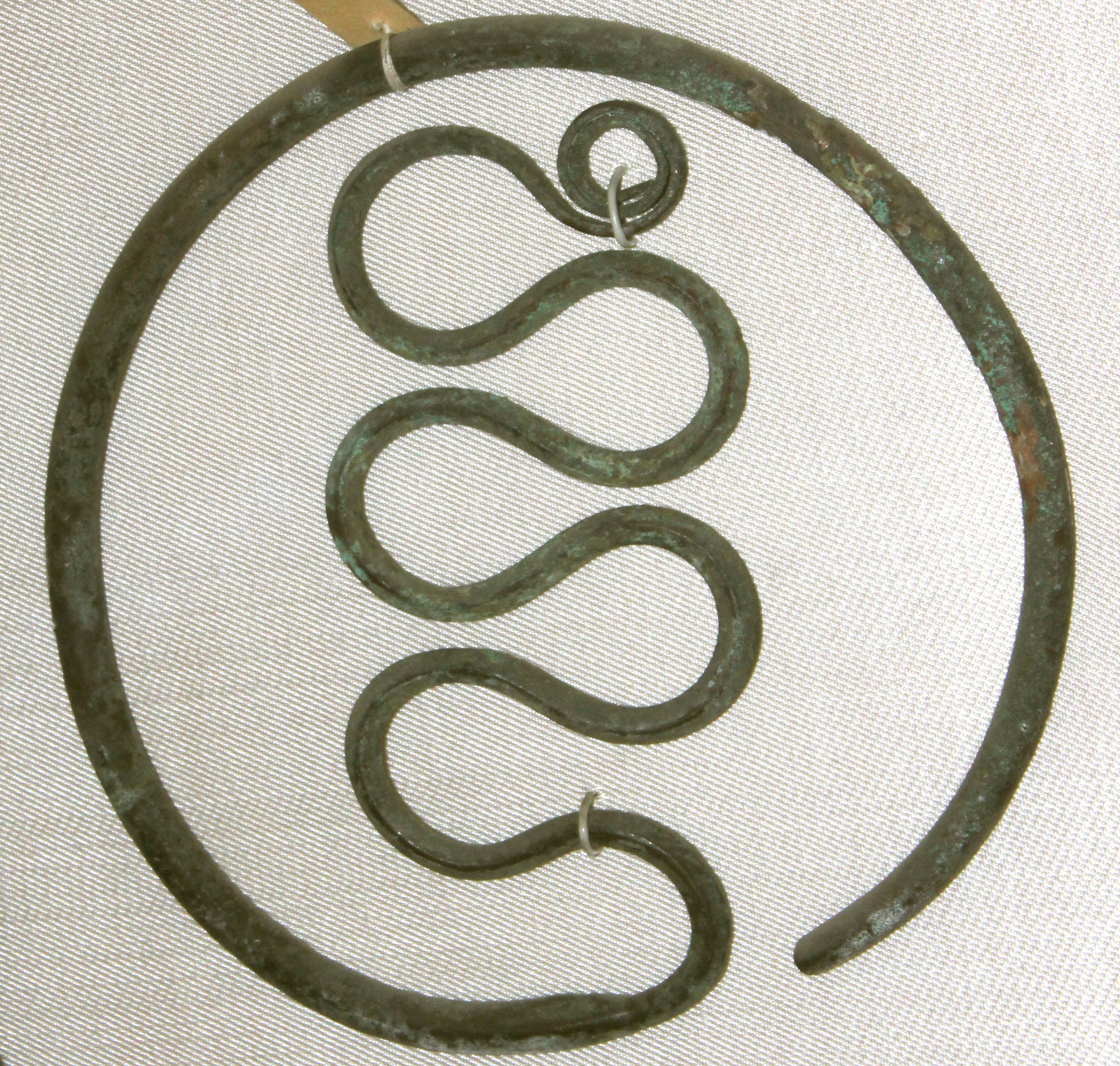
Copper amulet from Gargalar tepesi belonging to Shomutepe culture. Gargalar is located in the same neighbourhood as Shomu-tepe. Ganja History-Ethnography Museum

The fireplaces used to heat the houses were placed near the walls. Some stoves were also located outside. The farm buildings of Shomutape had a circular plan like the residential houses.

Cereal grains, tools made of stone and bone, including grinding stones and bone sickles, were discovered in the Shomutape settlement. The lithic industry of the inhabitants was almost exclusively based on obsidian, consisting mainly of blades, but sometimes also using microliths.

A female figure made of bone was also found.

Ceramics were made of clay mixed with sand, and sometimes covered with red paint. They are mostly grit-tempered but sometimes also vegetal-tempered.

== Recent discoveries ==
In March 2025, an approximately 8,400-year-old Mesolithic human figurine was discovered in Damjili Cave, western Azerbaijan's Qazax District, by a collaborative Azerbaijani-Japanese team. This small stone artifact, dating to between 6400 and 6100 BC, was carved from river stone. Measuring 51 mm in length and 15 mm in width, the figurine lacks gender-specific features, which contrasts with the predominantly female clay figurines characteristic of the later Neolithic period. Researchers associate the figurine with the early Shomutepe culture.

== See also ==
- History of Azerbaijan

== Bibliography ==
- Baudouin, Emmanuel (2019-06-01). "Rethinking architectural techniques of the Southern Caucasus in the 6th millennium BC: A re-examination of former data and new insights". Paléorient (45–1): 115–150. doi:10.4000/paleorient.602. ISSN 0153-9345.
- R. M. MUNCHAEV, Shomutepe - article in "The Great Soviet Encyclopedia" (1979)
