= Prehistoric Georgia =

Human habitation in Georgia before written records

The prehistory of Georgia is the period between the first human habitation of the territory of modern-day nation of Georgia and the time when Assyrian and Urartian, and more firmly, the Classical accounts, brought the proto-Georgian tribes into the scope of recorded history.

== Paleolithic, Mesolithic ==
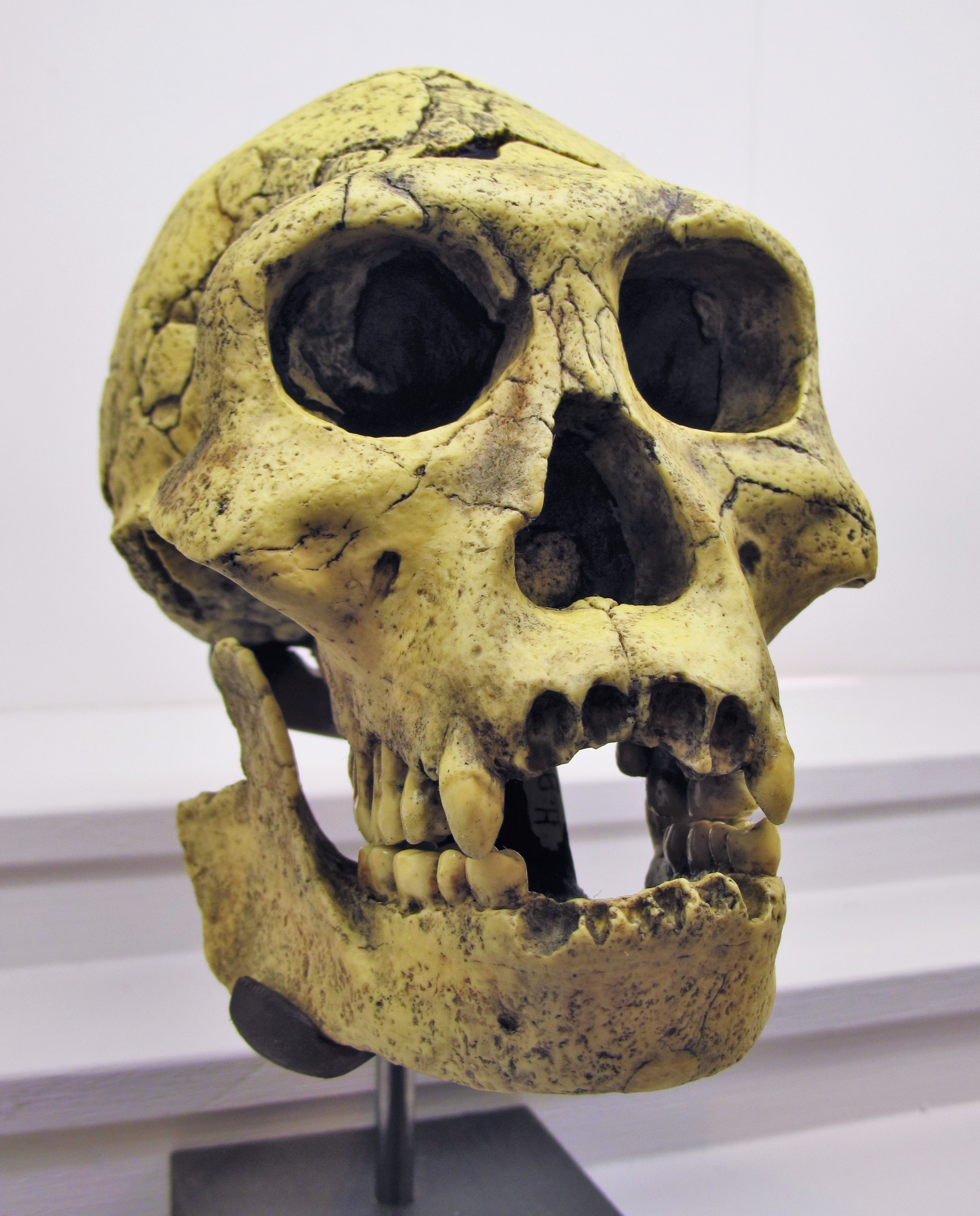
Modern reproduction of a Homo erectus skull found at Dmanisi displayed in the Cantonal Museum of Geology, Switzerland (2009)

Humans have been living in Georgia for an extremely long time, as attested by the discoveries, in 1999 and 2002, of two Homo erectus skulls (H. e. georgicus) at Dmanisi in southern Georgia. The archaeological layer in which the human remains, hundreds of stone tools and numerous animal bones were unearthed is dated approximately 1.6-1.8 million years ago (since the underlying basalt lava bed yielded an age of approximately 1.8 million years). The site yields the earliest unequivocal evidence for presence of early humans outside the African continent.

Later Lower Paleolithic Acheulian sites have been discovered in the highlands of Georgia, particularly in the caves of Kudaro (1600 m above sea level), and Tsona (2100 m). Acheulian open-air sites and find-spots are also known in other regions of Georgia, for example at the Javakheti Plateau where Acheulian handaxes were found at 2400 m above sea level.

The first uninterrupted primitive settlement on the Georgian territory dates back to the Middle Paleolithic era, more than 200,000 years ago. Sites of this period have been found in Shida Kartli, Imeretia, Abkhazia and other areas.

Buffered by the Caucasus Mountains, and benefiting from the ameliorating effects of the Black Sea, the region appears to have served as a biogeographical refugium throughout the Pleistocene. These geographic features spared the Southern Caucasus from the severe climatic oscillations and allowed humans to prosper throughout much of the region for millennia.

Upper Paleolithic remains have been investigated in Satsurblia, Devis Khvreli, Sakazhia, Sagvarjile, Dzudzuana, Samertskhle Klde, Gvarjilas Klde and other cave sites. A cave at Dzudzuana has yielded the earliest known dyed flax fibers that date back to 36,000 BP. At that time, the eastern area of the South Caucasus appears to have been sparsely populated in contrast to the valleys of the Rioni River and Kvirila River in western Georgia. The Paleolithic ended some 10,000-12,000 years ago to be succeeded by the Mesolithic culture (Kotias Klde). It was when the geographic medium and landscapes of the Caucasus were finally shaped as we have them today.

== Neolithic ==
Signs of Neolithic culture, and the transition from foraging and hunting to agriculture and stockraising, are found in Georgia from at least the beginning of the 6th millennium BC. The so-called early Neolithic sites are chiefly found in western Georgia. These are Khutsubani, Anaseuli, Kistriki, Kobuleti, Tetramitsa, Apiancha, Makhvilauri, Kotias Klde, Paluri and others. In the 5th millennium BC, the Kura (Mtkvari) basin also became stably populated, and settlements such as those at Tsopi, Aruchlo, and Sadakhlo along the Kura in eastern Georgia are distinguished by a long lasting cultural tradition, distinctive architecture, and considerable skill in stoneworking. Most of these sites relate to the flourishing late Neolithic/Eneolithic archaeological complex known as the Shulaveri-Shomu culture. Radiocarbon dating at Shulaveri sites indicates that the earliest settlements there date from the late sixth − early fifth millennium BC.

In the highlands of eastern Anatolia and South Caucasus, the right combination of domesticable animals and sowable grains and legumes made possible the earliest agriculture. In this sense, the region can justly be considered one of the "cradles of civilization".

The entire region is surmised to have been, in the period beginning in the last quarter of the 4th millennium BC, inhabited by people who were possibly ethnically related and of Hurrian stock. The ethnic and cultural unity of these 2,000 years is characterized by some scholars as Chalcolithic or Eneolithic.

== Bronze Age ==
Early metallurgy started in Georgia during the 6th millennium BC. Very early metal objects have been discovered in layers of the Neolithic Shulaveri-Shomutepe culture. From the beginning of the 4th millennium, metal use became more extensive in East Georgia and in the whole Transcaucasian region.

From c. 3400 BC to 2000 BC, the region saw the development of the Kura-Araxes or Early Transcaucasian culture centered on the basins of Kura and Aras. During this era, economic stability based on cattle and sheep raising and noticeable cultural development was achieved. The local chieftains appear to have been men of wealth and power. Their burial mounds have yielded finely wrought vessels in gold and silver; a few are engraved with ritual scenes suggesting the Middle Eastern cult influence. This vast and flourishing culture was in contact with the more advanced civilization of Akkadian Mesopotamia, but went into gradual decline and stagnated c. 2300 BC, being eventually broken up into a number of regional cultures. One of the earliest of these successor cultures is the Bedeni culture in eastern Georgia.

At the end of the 3rd millennium BC, there is evidence of considerable economic development and increased commerce among the tribes. In western Georgia, a unique culture known as Colchian developed between 1800 and 700 BC, and in eastern Georgia the kurgan (tumulus) culture of Trialeti reached its zenith around 1500 BC.

Archaeological sites in Klde, Orchosani, and Saphar-Kharaba were revealed by the BTC pipeline construction.

== Iron Age and Classical Antiquity ==
By the last centuries of the 2nd millennium BC, ironworking had made its appearance in the South Caucasus, and the true Iron Age began with the introduction of tools and weapons on a large scale and of superior quality to those hitherto made of copper and bronze, a change which in most of the Near East may not have come before the tenth or ninth centuries BC.

During this period, as linguists have estimated, the ethnic and linguistic unity of the Proto-Kartvelians finally broke up into several branches that now form the Kartvelian family. The first to break away was the Svan language in northwest Georgia, in about the 19th century BC, and by the 8th century BC, Zan, the basis of Mingrelian and Laz, had become a distinct language. On the basis of language, it has been established that the earliest Kartvelian ethnos were made up of four principally related tribes: the Karts, the Zans (Megrelo-Laz, Colchians), and the Svans – which would eventually form the basis of the modern Kartvelian-speaking groups.

== See also ==
- Prehistoric Asia
- Prehistoric Europe
- Prehistoric Caucasus
