= Shulaveri–Shomu culture =

Late Stone Age culture in the south Caucasus

Shulaveri-Shomu culture
- Geographical range: southern Caucasus region
- Period: Neolithic
- Dates: c. 6000 BC – c. 5000 BC
- Major sites: Shaumiani, Shomu-tepe
- Preceded by: Trialetian culture
- Followed by: Chaff-Faced Ware culture, Trialeti culture

The Shulaveri–Shomu culture, also known as the Shulaveri-Shomutepe-Aratashen culture, is an archaeological culture that existed on the territory of present-day Georgia, Azerbaijan, and Armenia, as well as parts of northern Iran during the Late Neolithic/Eneolithic. It lasted from around the end of the seventh millennium BC to the beginning of the fifth millennium BC.

== Type-sites ==
The name of the Shulaveri-Shomutepe-Aratashen culture comes from the respective archaeological sites of Shulaveri, in Georgia, (known since 1925 as Shaumiani); Shomu-Tepe, in the Agstafa District of Azerbaijan; and Aratashen, on the Ararat Plain in Armenia. The Shulaveri–Shomu culture has been distinguished during the excavations on the sites of Shomutepe and Babadervis in Western Azerbaijan by I. Narimanov (between 1958 and 1964) and at Shulaveris Gora in Eastern Georgia by A.I. Dzhavakhisvili and T.N Chubinishvili (from 1966 to 1976). Discoveries from the sites have revealed that the same cultural features spread on the northern foothills of Lesser Caucasus mountains.

The Shulaveri-Shomutepe culture can be differentiated into three groups based on their location and material cultures. The first group is found in the central south Caucasus around the middle Kura. This group includes western regions of modern Azerbaijan and the Kvemo Kartli region in modern southeast Georgia. Sites in this group include Shomutepe, Shulavris Gora, Göytepe, and the nearby Mentesh Tepe (near Tovuz, Azerbaijan). The second group includes the Nakhichevan region, the Mil plain, and the Mugan steppe. Sites include Kültepe I, Alikemek Tepesi, Kamiltepe, and Ilanly Tepe. This group is distinguished by cultural connections with northern Mesopotamia and Iran, and relatively advanced metallurgy. The third group is located in the Ararat Plain in modern Armenia, and includes the Aratashen and Aknashen-Khatunarkh sites. Many of the above sites, including Shomutepe and Shulaveri, can be seen on a map of the prehistoric southern Caucasus.

== Background ==
The Shulaveri–Shomu culture covers the period from around the end of the seventh millennium BC to the beginning of the fifth millennium BC. The majority of activity dates to the second half of the sixth millennium BC.

Although the Shulaveri–Shomutepe complex firstly was attributed to the Eneolithic era, it is now considered as a material and cultural example of the Neolithic era except the upper layers where metal objects have been discovered as in Khramis Didi-Gora and Aruchlo I.

The Shulaveri–Shomu culture predates the Maykop and Kura-Araxes cultures which flourished in this area around 4000–2200 BC, and the middle Bronze Age (c. 3000–1500 BC) Trialeti culture. The Sioni culture of Eastern Georgia possibly represents a transition from the Shulaveri to the Kura-Arax cultural complex.

== Material culture ==
=== Subsistence ===
The people of the Shulaveri–Shomu culture were proficient farmers, with comparatively advanced knowledge of the domestication of animals and plants. Evidence found at the sites indicates that livelihood was based on cereal cultivation and domestic animal breeding. Domesticated animals including goat, sheep, cow, pig, and dog are found from the earliest phase of this culture. A wide variety of cultivated plants are found, including 10 species of wheat and several types of barley, as well as oats, millet, sorgum, lentil, pea, bean, cultivated grape, melon, sorrel, amaranth, and goosefoots, perhaps indicating long-term cultivation and local domestication. Farming was partly assisted by the construction of irrigation canals. Around 5900 BC, villagers at Gadachrili attempted to divert the Shulaveri river to the nearby fields using a system of canals. This is the oldest example of water management in the Caucasus. The attempt seems to have been successful, but sediment deposition due to slow water flow probably necessitated regular maintenance. Hunting and fishing were less significant means of subsistence; game included a wide variety of species including deer, wild goat, aurochs, wild horse, hare, fox, jackal, gazelle, badger, wolf, turtle, and numerous species of birds. Fish included gobio, roach, barbel, pike, and sturgeon.

=== Settlements and structures ===
Shulaveri-Shomu settlements are concentrated in the middle Kura river, Ararat valley, and Nakhchivan plain regions. They are found on artificial hills, or tells, which emerged from the accumulation of occupation layers at the same site. Settlements usually consist of three to five villages, which are usually less than 1 hectare in area, with perhaps dozens or hundreds of inhabitants; larger sites, such as Khramis Didi Gora, can be as much as 4 or 5 hectares, with perhaps several thousand residents. Qarabel Tepe, a large and unique Late Neolithic site on the Mil Plain consisting of multiple mounds, has pottery and tool finds spread over an 8 hectare area. Larger settlements may have played a central role within a cluster of villages. Some were surrounded by trenches, which were either defensive or for ritual purposes. Although several metres of deposits are found at several sites, they may have only been occupied for short lengths of time.

Settlements consisted of mud-brick circular, oval, and semi-oval single-storey and single-room buildings with domed roofs. Hearths are found in residential structures. The buildings were different sizes based on their intended purpose. Larger buildings, with diameters ranging from 2 to 5 metres, were used as living areas, while smaller buildings were used as storage (1–2 m diameter). Entrances of buildings at Shulaveri and Shomutepe take the form of a narrow doorway. Floors may have been painted with red ochre. Flues in the middle of the roofs provided light and ventilation.

Small, semi-subterranean, circular clay bins are commonly found at Shulaveri-Shomu sites in association with residential structures, and have been interpreted as storage containers for grain or tools.

=== Ceramics ===
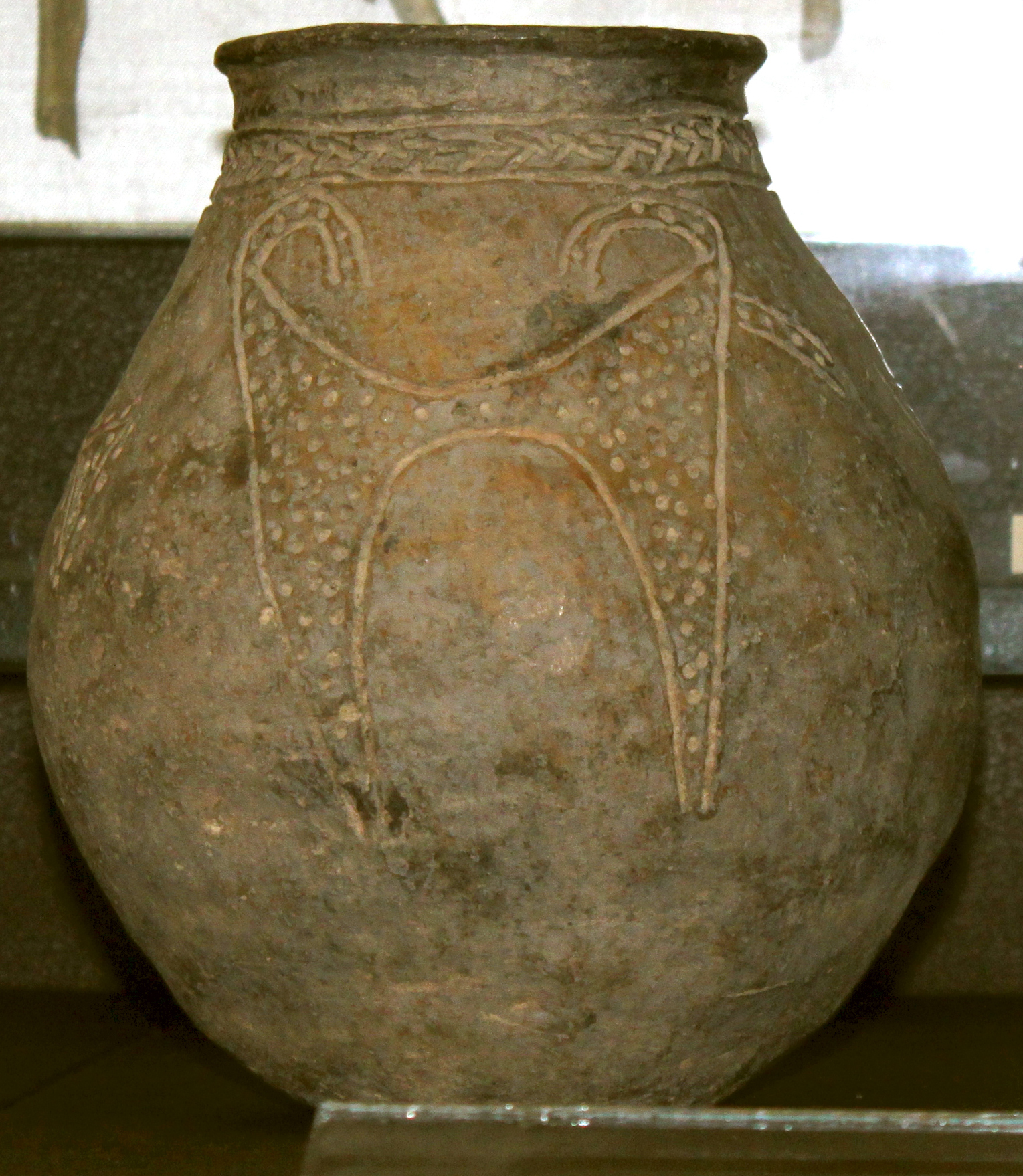
Neolithic pottery from Ilanlitepe. Nizami Ganjavi Ganja State History-Ethnography Museum

Levels of ceramic production in Shulaveri–Shomu:

I stage	Rough pots with jutting base
II stage	Finely decorated pottery
III stage	Rough coloured and decorated ceramics with flat bases
IV stage	Dyed pots
V stage	Fine red polished pottery

Early Shulaveri–Shomu culture had very few ceramic vessels, which were imported from Mesopotamia. Local ceramic production dates from around 5800 BC. Handmade pottery with engraved decorations have been discovered during excavations. Territorial clay was used in the production of earthenware. Basalt and grog, later plant materials were used as temper in pottery.

=== Tools ===
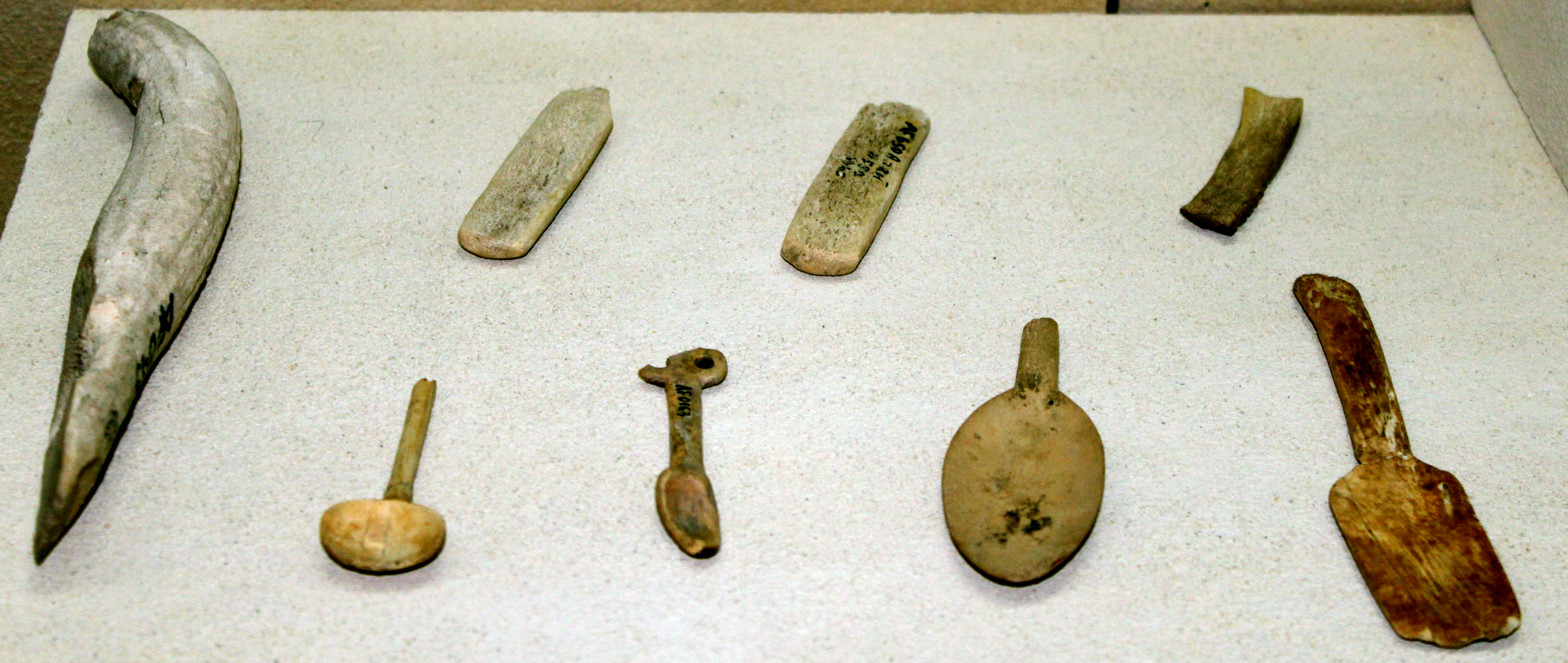
Bone spoons, polishing implements, and boards from Kultepe I, Babadervish, and Shomutepe sites

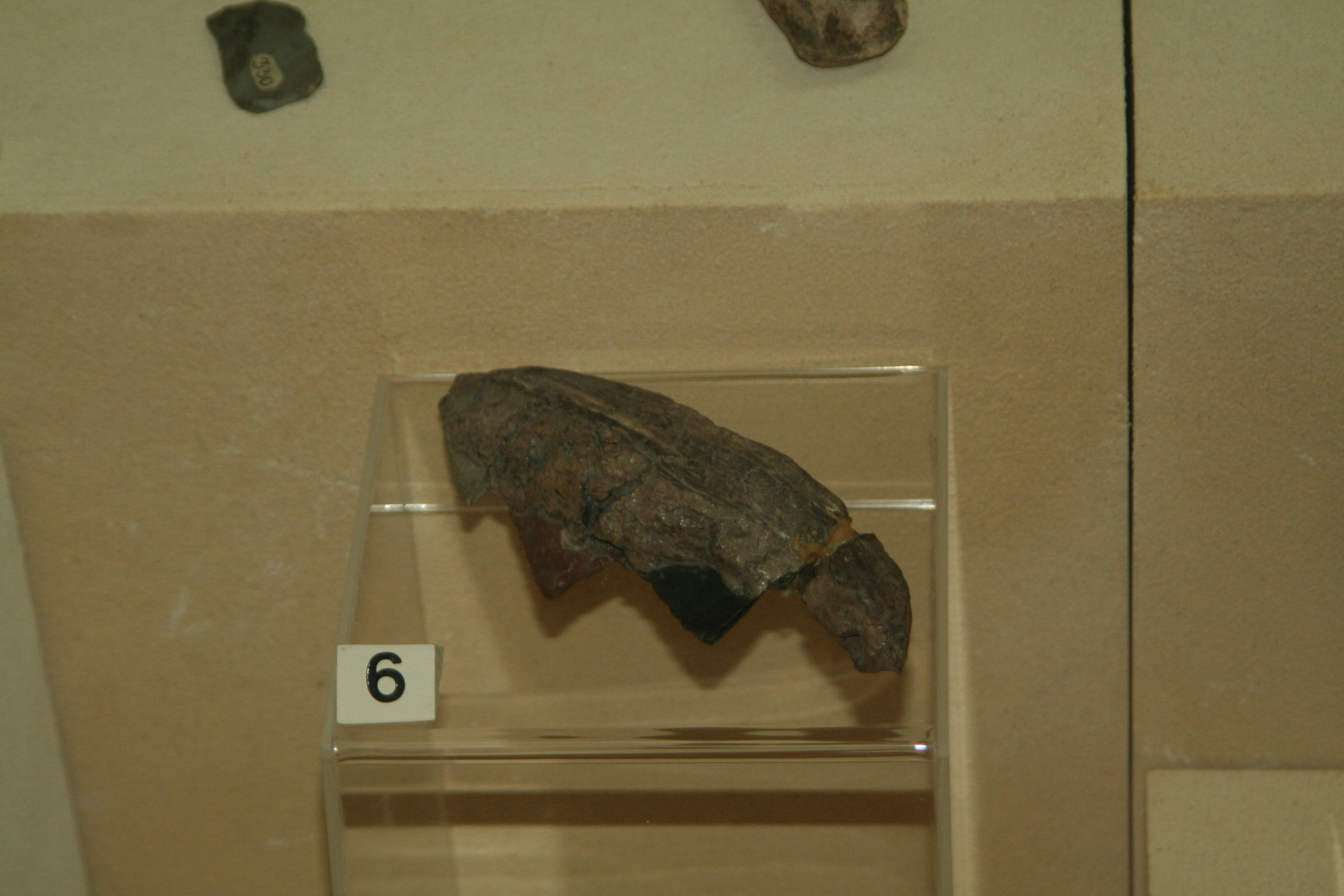
A sickle made from bone found at Shomutepe

Tools such as blades, burins and scrapers, made from materials including obsidian, bone, and antler have been discovered.

Pestles revealed in Shulaveri–Shomu sites were mainly made of basalt (50%), metamorphic rocks (34%) and sandstones (11%).

=== Metalwork ===
Metal items are rarely found at Shulaveri-Shomu sites. Yet they become more common towards its end, at the end of the 6th millennium BC, especially in the middle Kura valley. "Compositional analyses of some of these ornaments and small tools revealed that they are made of unalloyed copper".

In Aratashen (Armenia), 57 arsenical copper beads were discovered in the Shulaveri-Shomu context.

Dated to 5800-5300 BC, fragments of a copper bead have been found in Aruchlo. Three small vessels with copper residues were also found, and interpreted as crucibles by the excavators. Also, at Göy-Tepe, in the Tovuz district of Azerbaijan some metallurgy is attested in the Shulaveri-Shomu context. But it's only later, with the advent of Sioni culture, that metalwork becomes better established.

=== Ritual ===
Burials are relatively rare, and are mainly found under house floors or courtyards. At the Mentesh Tepe site, one tomb contained the skeletons of 31 male and female individuals of various ages.

Anthropomorphic figurines of mainly seated women found in the sites may have been used for religious purposes relating to a fertility cult.

=== Earliest grapes and winemaking ===
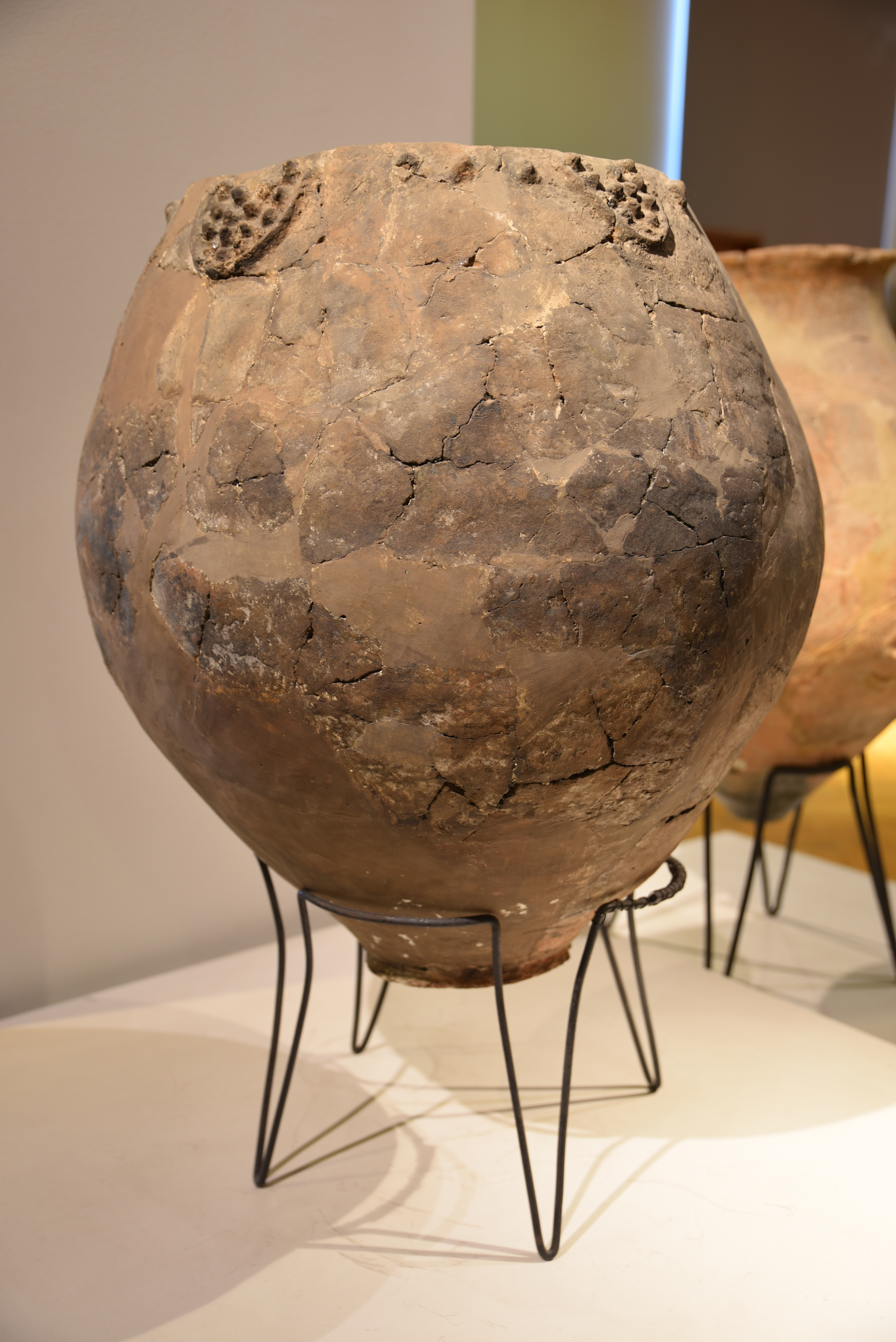
6th millennium BC wine jar, discovered in Shulaveri, Georgia

The earliest evidence of domesticated grapes in the world has been found in the general "Shulaveri area", near the site of Shulaveri gora, in Marneuli Municipality, in southeastern Republic of Georgia. Specifically, the most recent evidence comes from Gadachrili Gora, near the village of Imiri in the same region; carbon-dating points to the date of about 6000 BC.

Chemical analysis of organic compounds found in some of the numerous very high capacity pottery jars at Shulaveri-Shomu sites indicates that they contained wine, and were probably used as fermentation, maturation, and serving vessels. This evidence dates to around the early sixth millennium BC, providing the earliest evidence for winemaking and grape cultivation in the Near East.

== Geographical links ==
Many of the characteristic traits of the Shulaverian material culture (circular mudbrick architecture, pottery decorated by plastic design, anthropomorphic female figurines, obsidian industry with an emphasis on production of long prismatic blades) are believed to have their origin in the Near Eastern Neolithic (Hassuna, Halaf).

The technology and typology of bone-based instruments are similar to those of the Middle East Neolithic material culture. A quern with 2 small hollows found in Shomutepe is similar to the one with more hollows detected in Khramisi Didi-Gora(Georgia). The similarities between the macrolithic tools and the use of ochre also bring Shulaveri–Shomu culture closer to the culture of Halaf. Pestles and mortars found in Shulaveri–Shomu sites and Late Neolithic layers of Tell Sabi Abyad in Syria are also similar to each other.

== See also ==
- Trialeti culture
- Archaeology of Azerbaijan
- Prehistoric Armenia
- Prehistoric Georgia
- Kura-Araxes culture
- Goytepe archaeological complex

== Bibliography ==
- Baumer, Christoph (2021). History of the Caucasus. Volume one, At the crossroads of empires. London: I.B. Tauris. ISBN 978-1-78831-007-9. OCLC 1259549144.
- Boisseau, Peter (25 July 2022). "Archaeologists find earliest evidence of winemaking". utoronto.ca.
- Chataigner, Christine (2016). "Environments and Societies in the Southern Caucasus during the Holocene". Quaternary International. 395: 1–4. Bibcode:2016QuInt.395....1C. doi:10.1016/j.quaint.2015.11.074. ISSN 1040-6182.
- Hamon, Caroline (2008). "From Neolithic to Chalcolithic in the Southern Caucasus: Economy and Macrolithic Implements from Shulaveri-Shomu Sites of Kwemo-Kartli (Georgia)". Paléorient (in French). 34 (2): 85–135. doi:10.3406/paleo.2008.5258. ISSN 0153-9345.
- Hamon, Caroline; Jalabadze, Mindia; Agapishvili, Tata; Baudouin, Emmanuel; Koridze, Irakli; Messager, Erwann (2016). "Gadachrili Gora: Architecture and organisation of a Neolithic settlement in the middle Kura Valley (6th millennium BC, Georgia)". Quaternary International. 395: 154–169. Bibcode:2016QuInt.395..154H. doi:10.1016/j.quaint.2015.01.055. ISSN 1040-6182.
- Kadowaki, Seiji; Maher, Lisa; Portillo, Marta; Albert, Rosa M.; Akashi, Chie; Guliyev, Farhad; Nishiaki, Yoshihiro (2015). "Geoarchaeological and palaeobotanical evidence for prehistoric cereal storage in the southern Caucasus: the Neolithic settlement of Göytepe (mid 8th millennium BP)". Journal of Archaeological Science. 53: 408–425. Bibcode:2015JArSc..53..408K. doi:10.1016/j.jas.2014.10.021.
- Kiguradze, T. (2001). "Caucasian Neolithic". In Ember, Melvin (ed.). Encyclopedia of Prehistory. Vol. 4. Kluwer Academic / Plenum Publishers. pp. 55–76. ISBN 0306462559.
- Kiguradze, T.; Menabde, M. (2004). "The Neolithic of Georgia". In Sagona, A. (ed.). A View from the Highlands: Archaeological Studies in Honour of Charles Burney. Ancient Near Eastern Studies Supplement 12. Peeters. pp. 345–398. ISBN 9789042913523.
- Kipfer, Barbara Ann (2021). Encyclopedic dictionary of archaeology (2nd ed.). Cham, Switzerland: Springer. ISBN 978-3-030-58292-0. OCLC 1253375738.
- Kohl, Philip L.; Trifonov, Viktor (2014), "The Prehistory of the Caucasus: Internal Developments and External Interactions", in Renfrew, Colin; Bahn, Paul (eds.), The Cambridge World Prehistory, Cambridge: Cambridge University Press, pp. 1571–1595, doi:10.1017/cho9781139017831.096, ISBN 978-0-521-11993-1
- Kushnareva, Karinė Khristoforovna (1997). The southern Caucasus in prehistory : stages of cultural and socioeconomic development from the eighth to the second millennium B.C. Philadelphia: University of Pennsylvania Museum. ISBN 0-924171-50-2. OCLC 37341216.
- Lyonnet, Bertille; Guliyev, Farhad; Bouquet, Laurence; Bruley-Chabot, Gaëlle; Samzun, Anaïck; Pecqueur, Laure; Jovenet, Elsa; Baudouin, Emmanuel; Fontugne, Michel; Raymond, Pascal; Degorre, Emeline; Astruc, Laurence; Guilbeau, Denis; Le Dosseur, Gaëlle; Benecke, Norbert (2016). "Mentesh Tepe, an early settlement of the Shomu-Shulaveri Culture in Azerbaijan" (PDF). Quaternary International. 395: 170–183. Bibcode:2016QuInt.395..170L. doi:10.1016/j.quaint.2015.02.038.
- McGovern, Patrick; Jalabadze, Mindia; Batiuk, Stephen; Callahan, Michael P.; Smith, Karen E.; Hall, Gretchen R.; Kvavadze, Eliso; Maghradze, David; Rusishvili, Nana; Bouby, Laurent; Failla, Osvaldo; Cola, Gabriele; Mariani, Luigi; Boaretto, Elisabetta; Bacilieri, Roberto (2017). "Early Neolithic wine of Georgia in the South Caucasus". Proceedings of the National Academy of Sciences. 114 (48): E10309–E10318. Bibcode:2017PNAS..11410309M. doi:10.1073/pnas.1714728114. ISSN 0027-8424. PMC 5715782. PMID 29133421.
- B. B. Piotrovskiĭ; G. M. Bongard-Levin (1988). Ancient civilisations of East and West. Moscow: Progress Publishers. ISBN 5-01-001823-3. OCLC 19282097.
- Ricci, Andrea; D'Anna, Maria Bianca; Lawrence, Dan; Helwing, Barbara; Aliyev, Tevekkül (2018). "Human mobility and early sedentism: the Late Neolithic landscape of southern Azerbaijan". Antiquity. 92 (366): 1445–1461. doi:10.15184/aqy.2018.230. ISSN 0003-598X. S2CID 165237658.
- Rusišvili, Nana (2010). Vazis kultura sak'art'veloshi sap'udzvelze palaeobotanical monats'emebi = The grapevine culture in Georgia on basis of palaeobotanical data. Tbilisi: "Mteny" Association. ISBN 978-9941-0-2525-9. OCLC 896211680.
- Sagona, A. G. (2018). The archaeology of the Caucasus : from earliest settlements to the Iron Age. New York: Cambridge University Press. ISBN 978-1-108-52351-6. OCLC 1013889124.
