= Chaff-Faced Ware =

Chaff-Faced Ware culture
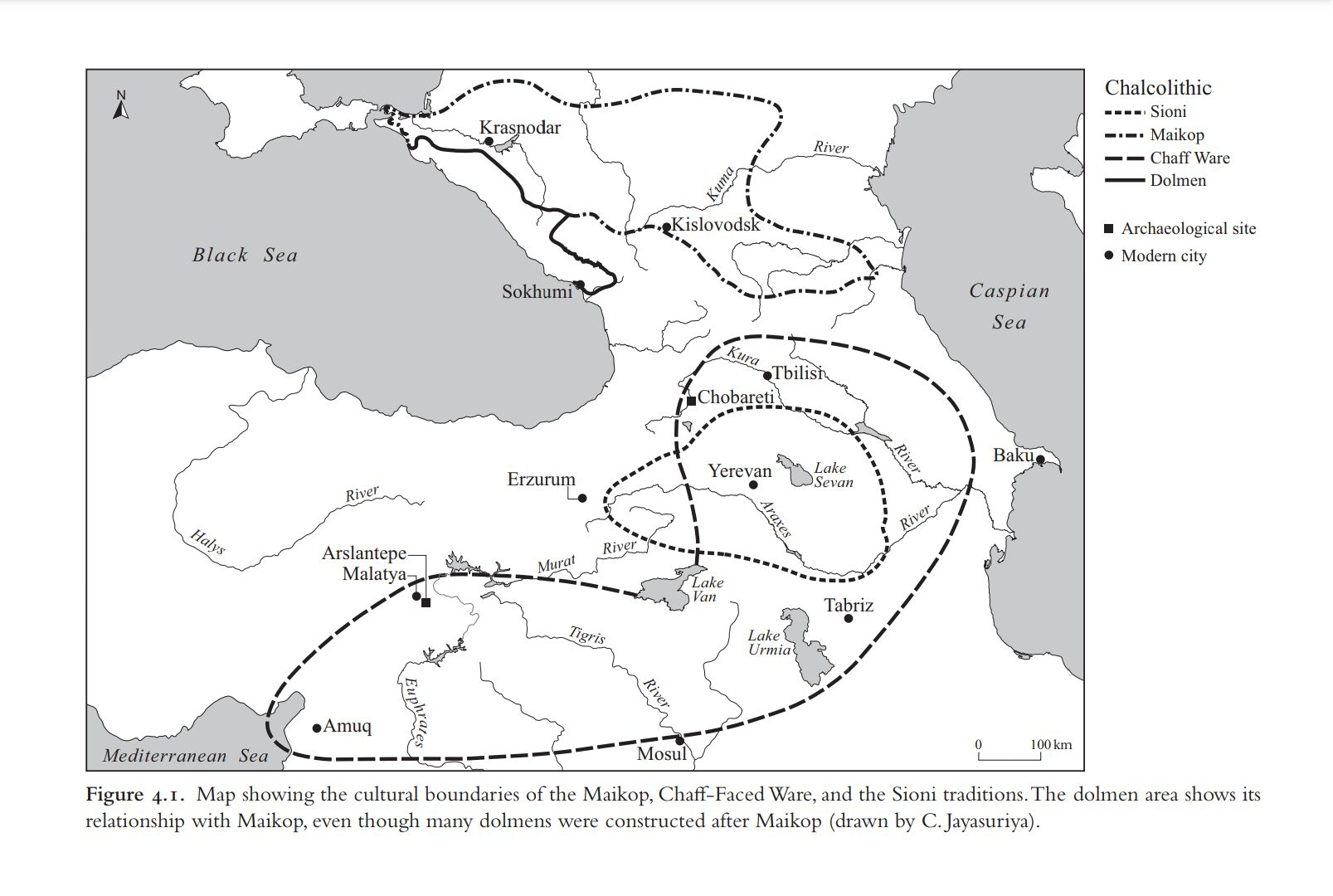
- Geographical range: Turkey, South Caucasus, Iran, Iraq, Syria
- Period: Late Chalcolithic
- Dates: 4500 BC - 3500 BC
- Major sites: Amuq, Leyla-Tepe culture, Areni-1 cave
- Preceded by: Ubaid period, Shulaveri–Shomu culture
- Followed by: Kura–Araxes culture

Chaff-Faced Ware (sometimes abbreviated as CFW, and alternately called Chaff-Tempered Ware) is a Late Chalcolithic (4300-3500BCE) pottery which has found from Cilicia to the South Caucasus. In the South Caucasus, its variant is known as Leyla-Tepe culture, while in northern Mesopotamia it is usually referred to as Amuq F pottery.

== Origin ==
The wider map of Uruk and Chaff-Faced Ware culture expansion from Syria to southern Iran during the Late Uruk period ca 3500-3300 BC

Initially, Chaff-Faced Ware was associated with northern Mesopotamia, Syria and a migration of Uruk people, but recently the discovery of large number of Chaff-Faced Ware sites in the South Caucasus has changed the perceptions about its origins. Catherine Marro concluded that the core region from where the ware emerged was between the Euphrates and the Kura basin. The tempering chaff in the pottery was frequent in South Caucasian Neolithic sites. This type of ware is also known as a Beveled rim bowl.

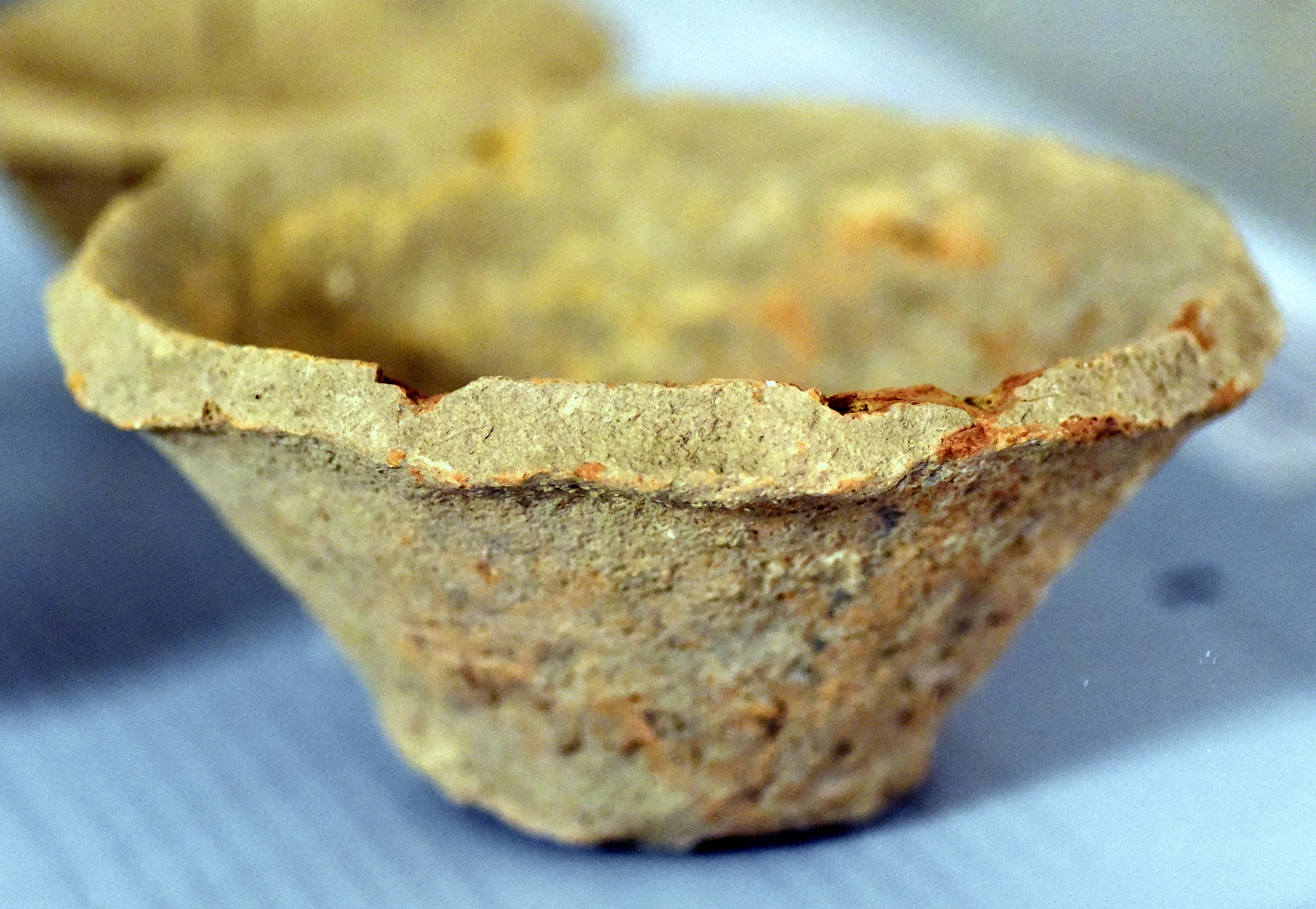
Typical Urukean Beveled Rim Bowl from northern Iraq. Uruk period, 4000-3100 BCE, featuring Chaff-Faced appearance. Sulaymaniyah Museum, Iraq

== See also ==
- Leyla-Tepe culture
- Amuq
- Areni-1 cave
