= Aknashen =

Aknashen Ակնաշեն
- Location within Armenia
- Coordinates: 40°05′45″N 44°17′10″E
- Country: Armenia
- Marz (Province): Armavir

Population (2011)
  - Total: 1,569
- Time zone: UTC+4 ( )
  - Summer (DST): UTC+5 ( )

Aknashen (Armenian: Ակնաշեն, also Romanized as Aknachen; until 1978, Khatunarkh Verin, Verin Khatunarkh, and Khatunarkh, also Russified as Verkhniy Khatunarkh) is a town in the Armavir Province of Armenia. The town's church is dedicated to Saint Bartholomew; nearby is a ruin of an 8th-century building.

== Archaeology ==
Evidence from charred remains and crop processing residues in pisé have been discovered at the Neolithic settlements of Aratashen and Aknashen. These settlements are located close together. Recently, an 8000-year old settlement was excavated at Aknashen

Aknashen is located in the basin of the Sev Jur (Metsamor) River (fr:Metsamor (rivière)), at an altitude of 900m above sea level. In 1969–1982 it was excavated by R.M. Torosyan. The Late Neolithic “Aratashen-Shulaveri-Shomutepe” cultural layer is represented by Horizons II–V. This lies directly under the Chalcolithic layer, and dates to the first half of the 6th millennium BC.

Obsidian geometric microliths have been discovered at Aknashen, which is somewhat unusual for Shulaveri-Shomu sites.

According to the excavators,

"... the identified Horizon VII [at Aknashen], separated from the overlying horizons of the “Aratashen-Shulaveri-Shomutepe” culture by hiatus, and stratigraphically and chronologically preceding the Late Neolithic, is partially filling the gap between the Early Holocene sites and the settlements of the “Aratashen-Shulaveri-Shomutepe” culture."

In recent research, the links of Aknashen with the Middle Kura Basin have become clear, as also the links with the Shulaveri–Shomu culture. The earliest Horizon VII started in 5950 BC. Some imported pottery was found there. Local pottery appears in Horizon V, around 5800 BC.

== See also ==
- Armavir Province

== External sites ==
- The Neolithic Settlement of Aknashen (Ararat valley, Armenia)
- Report of the results of the 2001 Armenian Census, Statistical Committee of Armenia
- Kiesling, Brady (2005), Rediscovering Armenia: Guide, Yerevan, Armenia: Matit Graphic Design Studio
- Kiesling, Brady (June 2000). Rediscovering Armenia: An Archaeological/Touristic Gazetteer and Map Set for the Historical Monuments of Armenia (PDF). Yerevan: Mattit. p. 40. ISBN 9994101218. Archived from the original (PDF) on 6 November 2021.
