= Damjili Cave =

Cave and archaeological site in Azerbaijan

- Damcılı mağarası
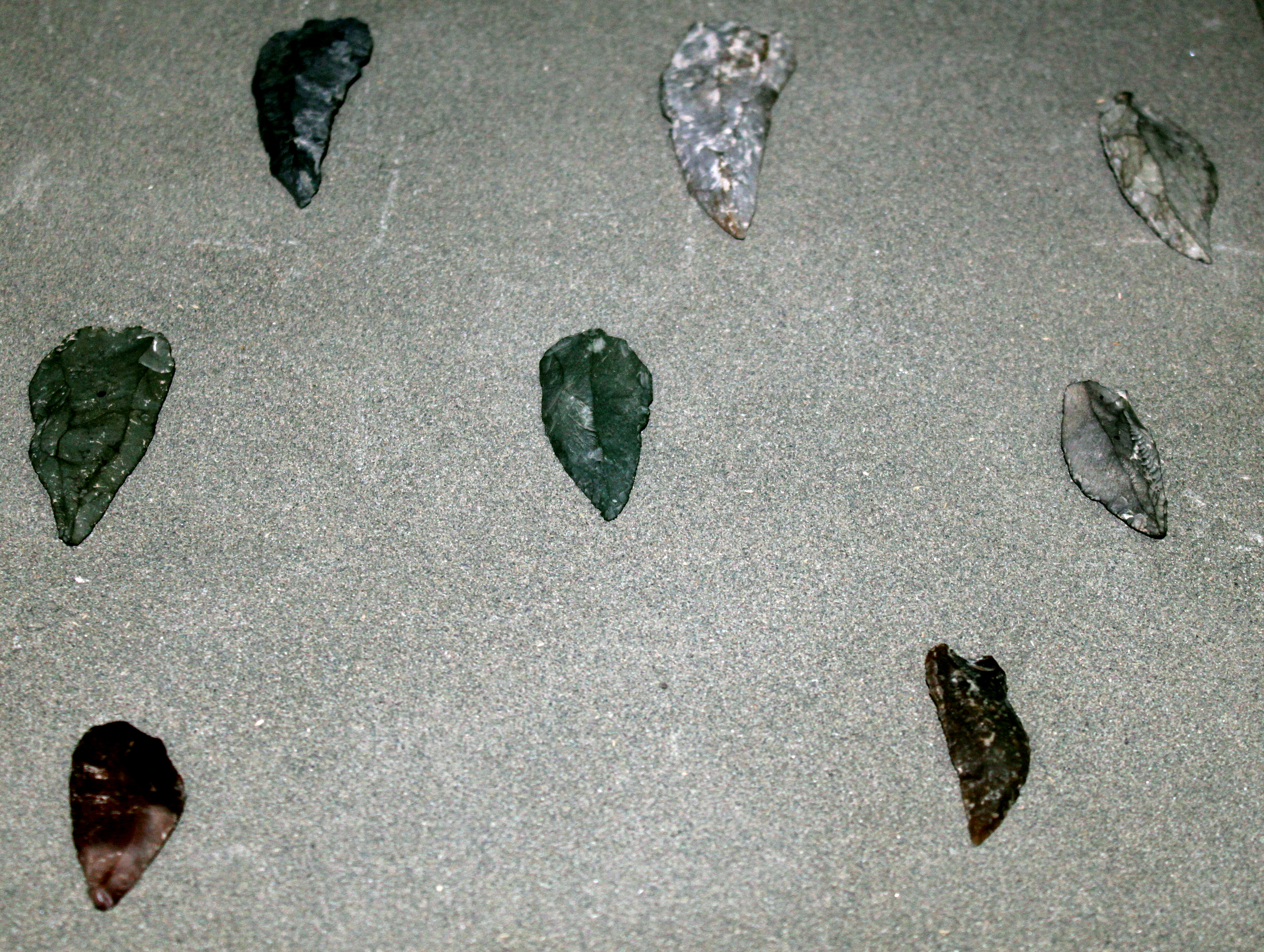
- stone tools

- location in Azerbaijan
- 41°8′53″N 45°14′28″E
- Periods: Paleolithic and Mesolithic
- Location: Daş Salahlı village
- Region: Gazakh rayon, Azerbaijan

Damjili (Azerbaijani: Damcılı mağarası) – is a half-circular shaped cave site (6400-6000 BC) in Azerbaijan, where evidence of prehistoric human presence during the Paleolithic and Mesolithic was discovered.

Various stone tools, arrowheads, flint knives, remains of hearth and fossilized bones of animals have been found in the cave.

Traces of ochre were found in a grotto of the cave, lending credence to the idea, that the occupants had a desire to deal with symbolism and aesthetics. The sediment layers, in which the ochre was found, are mixed with later ones which suggests that the use of ochre dates back to the Mousterian culture

== Overview ==
Damjili cave is the biggest cave among Avey Mountain caves. It has an area of 360 km^{2} (139.0 sq mi). The front side of the cave has been destroyed as the result of floods over the years. The height of the cave's rear side is 4 m (13.1 ft).

=== Location ===
The site is situated in the South-Eastern part of the Avey Mountain of the Small Caucasus, that extends from Daş Salahlı village in the Gazakh rayon to the Khram River.

=== Name of the Cave ===
The name Damjili is an allusion to "weeping water", that rinses through the natural cracks in the limestone cave walls (the Azeri word Damji (Azerbaijani: damcı) translates to drop).

=== Damjili spring ===
Water of Damjili spring dribbles down from the flinty top of the cave through the natural cracks. Pure and cold falling water drops are accumulating in the dent below and forming a spring. That is why the spring is called Damjili, literally meanining "with drops".

== Excavations ==
Damjılı cave was discovered for the first time in 1953 during the joint expedition of Russian scientist Zamyatin and Azerbaijani archaeologist Mammadali Husyenov.

Fragments of pottery dated back to the Bronze Age and Middle Ages were discovered from the primary excavations in the cave. The Paleolithic archaeological expedition formed under the History Museum of Academy of Science of Azerbaijan in 1956 conducted fundamental excavations in Damjili cave between 1956 and 1958 under the supervision of M.Huseynov.

In the result of this excavation, around 7,000 stone tools and more than 2,000 bones of hunting animals were found from different cultural layers of the cave.

In 2015–2017, a group of Azerbaijani and Japanese experts (led by the professor Yoshihiro Nishiaki of Tokyo University) conducted joint excavations in the area. The excavations began in 10 different directions. As a result, artefacts dating back to the Neolithic period, ruins of fireplaces, tools of Middle Paleolithic were discovered at a depth of 4 meters. The materials were investigated in Japanese laboratories.

=== Findings ===
The tools found in the Damjili cave trace back to the Middle Paleolithic – Mousterian period, Upper Paleolithic, Mezolithic, Neolithic, Eneolithic periods and Bronze Age.

Scrapers, cutting tools, awls, knife-shaped tools of Upper Paleolithic were mainly made from flint and obsidian stone.

Pencil-shaped nucleuses, small knife-shaped boards, tiny scrapers, cutting and pointed tools were attributed to Mezolithic, while arrowheads, polished stone object were attributed to the Neolithic period.

Mousterian and Meseolithic period findings consist of triangular spikes, big circular cutting tools and nucleuses which are considered to be used for hunting.

Some of the scrapers made of basalt are in circular shapes.

Disk shaped nucleuses tools are considered to belong to Neanderthal people 100,000-80,000 years ago settled in Damjili.

The results of recent Nishiaki excavations were published in 2022. According to the scholars,

"The 2016–2019 excavations at Damjili Cave, west Azerbaijan, revealed a stratified cultural sequence of the key Mesolithic-to-Neolithic transition period for the first time. Its radiocarbon chronology identified a rather abrupt emergence of the Neolithic economy at around 6000 cal BC, at least in the study region, urging a reconsideration of the long-standing claim that some other form of earlier Neolithic society had existed before this."

A precise stratigraphic sequence of the late seventh to the sixth millennium BC in the Caucasus area was previously lacking in scholarship. This has now been well documented by excavations. Rich cultural and subsistence assemblages of the Mesolithic-to-Neolithic transition period has been found.

== See also ==
- Osmantepe
- Goytepe archaeological complex
- Qazakh District
