= Arukhlo =

Coordinates: 41.4533°N 44.6957°E

Arukhlo (also known as Aruchlo, Arukhlo I) is a Neolithic settlement of Shulaveri–Shomu culture, located just to the west of the village of Nakhiduri, in Kvemo Kartli, Georgia (country), which is about 50 km southwest of the capital Tbilisi. It is the westernmost site of the Shulaveri-Shomutepe group.

The Arukhlo group of settlements consists of five mounds at the confluence of the Khrami and Mashavera rivers, which later join the Kura River. 8 kilometers from here are found some other sites of the Shulaveris group, Imiris Gora, Shulaveri Gora, and Khramis Didi Gora. These settlements occupy an area of about 800 hectares.

Aruchlo I mound rises about 6m from the modern ground surface. It was originally excavated from 1966 until 1985.

New excavations in Aruchlo started in 2005. The excavators determined that the settlement was occupied in the period of 5800-5400 BC.

The settlement consists of small round buildings that may have been used for storage or other activities, because they may be too small to live in.

According to 14C data, there is a clear break in settlement after 5400/5300 BC at this and other sites of the Shulaveri-Shomutepe group. For several centuries afterwards, no remains of rural settlements can be documented in the area. Some Sioni culture settlements emerge only later in the fifth millennium, but the information about them is not very clear.

== Metallurgy ==
Early copper metallurgy has been documented here and at some other related sites, such as Göy-Tepe, and Mentesh Tepe in the Tovuz district of Azerbaijan.

Dated to 5800-5300 BC, fragments of a copper bead have been found in Aruchlo. Three small vessels with copper residues were also found, and interpreted as crucibles by the excavators.

Copper items are rare in Shulaveri-Shomu culture. Yet they become more common towards its end, at the end of the 6th millennium BCE, especially in the middle Kura valley. "Compositional analyses of some of these ornaments and small tools revealed that they are made of unalloyed copper".

In particular, in Aratashen (Armenia), 57 arsenical copper beads were discovered in the Shulaveri-Shomu context.

== See also ==
- History of Georgia

== Literature ==
- Svend Hansen, Guram Mirtskhulava, Katrin Bastert-Lamprichs 2007, Aruchlo: A Neolithic Settlement Mound in the Caucasus. Field Report. NEO-LITHICS 1/07
