= Aratashen =

Village in Armavir, Armenia

Aratashen Առատաշեն
- Location within Armenia
- Coordinates: 40°07′43″N 44°13′39″E
- Country: Armenia
- Marz (Province): Armavir

Population (2011)
  - Total: 2,505
- Time zone: UTC+4 ( )
  - Summer (DST): UTC+5 ( )

Aratashen (Armenian: Առատաշեն, also Romanized as Arratashen; also, Artashen; until 1978 Zeyva Hayi – meaning "Armenian Zeyva", Zeyva, Bol’shaya Zeyva and Nerkin-Zeyva) is a town in the Armavir Province of Armenia. It is located on the Ararat Plain.

== Archaeology ==
A Neolithic-Chalcolithic tell is located south of the town.

The first occupation phase at Aratashen was pre-ceramic, going back to 6500 BCE. Parallels are found in the southeastern Trans-Caucasia, and in the northeastern Mesopotamia, especially based on the construction techniques and the lithic and bone tools.

Also the pottery, after it appears, is somewhat similar. The best parallels are with Kul Tepe of Nakhichevan to the south, and with the northern Near East, such as the lower levels of Hajji Firuz Tepe, at Dalma Tepe, and at Tilki Tepe.

The Shulaveri-Shomutepe culture, that developed in the neighbouring Kura basin and the Artsakh steppe, does not have close parallels with the early Aratashen artifacts.

At Aratashen, obsidian was discovered that came from Turkish sources at Meydan Dağ, in the Lake Van basin; these samples were found in association with the very early Halaf culture ware, which probably also came to Aratashen from the same area.

Other types of pottery appear at the end of the fifth millennium BC. At this time, the plain of Ararat was in contact with the contemporary populations of northern Mesopotamia, and also with those of the ‘Sioni culture’ of the Kura basin.

The pottery of the second occupation phase of Aratashen is becoming close to that in the Ararat plain. Here we see the influence of the Late Chalcolithic horizon of approximately 4300–3500 BC in the whole of northern Mesopotamia, such as:

"... development of straw-tempered ware, initial use of the slow wheel, early forms of standardization in manufacture and typological features ("Coba bowls"), a frequent surface treatment with light scraping..."

This pottery has many Transcaucasian, or Sioni culture features. Sioni culture generally succeeded the Shulaveri-Shomutepe culture in some areas. Here we already see the features of the later Kura–Araxes culture pottery.

== Metalwork ==
There's evidence of very early metallurgy at Aratashen, going back to the first half of the sixth millennium BCE. According to A. Courcier,

In the Neolithic level IId of Aratashen, dated to the beginnings of the sixth millennium BCE, several fragments of copper ores (malachite and azurite) and 57 arsenical copper beads were discovered. Close to Aratashen, at Khatunark, one fragment of copper ore (malachite) has been discovered in a level dated to the first half of the sixth millennium BCE. This artefact, together with those found at Aratashen, suggest the nascent emergence of metallurgy in the Ararat region already during the Late Neolithic.

Equally early metalwork has also been discovered in the excavations at Aruchlo in Georgia, and at Mentesh Tepe in the Tovuz district of modern-day Azerbaijan, and at several other sites in Southern Caucasus.

At Aratashen and Khatunakh/Aknashen, there are similarities to the contemporary sites of Kultepe I, and Alikemek-Tepesi. Another prehistoric site that is close to Aratashen is Masis Blur.

== See also ==
- Armavir Province
