= Daş Salahlı =

Dash Salahly
- Municipality
- Azerbaijani: Daş Salahlı
- Location within Azerbaijan
- Coordinates: 41°08′29″N 45°15′58″E
- Country: Azerbaijan
- District: Qazakh

Population
  - Total: 8,411
- Time zone: UTC+4 (AZT)
  - Summer (DST): UTC+5 (AZT)

Daş Salahlı (Dash Salahly) is a village and the most populous municipality in the Qazakh District of Azerbaijan, aside from the capital Qazakh. It has a population of 8,411.
