= Khojaly–Gadabay culture =

Archaeological culture in Karabakh region

The Khojaly-Gadabay culture (Azerbaijani: Xocalı-Gədəbəy mədəniyyəti), also known as the Ganja-Karabakh culture (Azerbaijani: Gəncə-Qarabağ mədəniyyəti) is an archaeological culture of the Late Bronze Age to Early Iron Age (roughly 13th to 7th centuries BC) in the Karabakh region of Transcaucasia. The eponymous sites are at Khojaly, Gadabay and Ganja in Azerbaijan.

It was excavated by Soviet archaeologists beginning in the 1920s.

It was described by Boris Piotrovsky and other archaeologists specializing in the prehistory of Transcaucasia during the 1930s to 1970s.

== Gallery ==
Findings from Khojaly burial grounds discovered in 1895 by E. Resler. Hermitage Museum

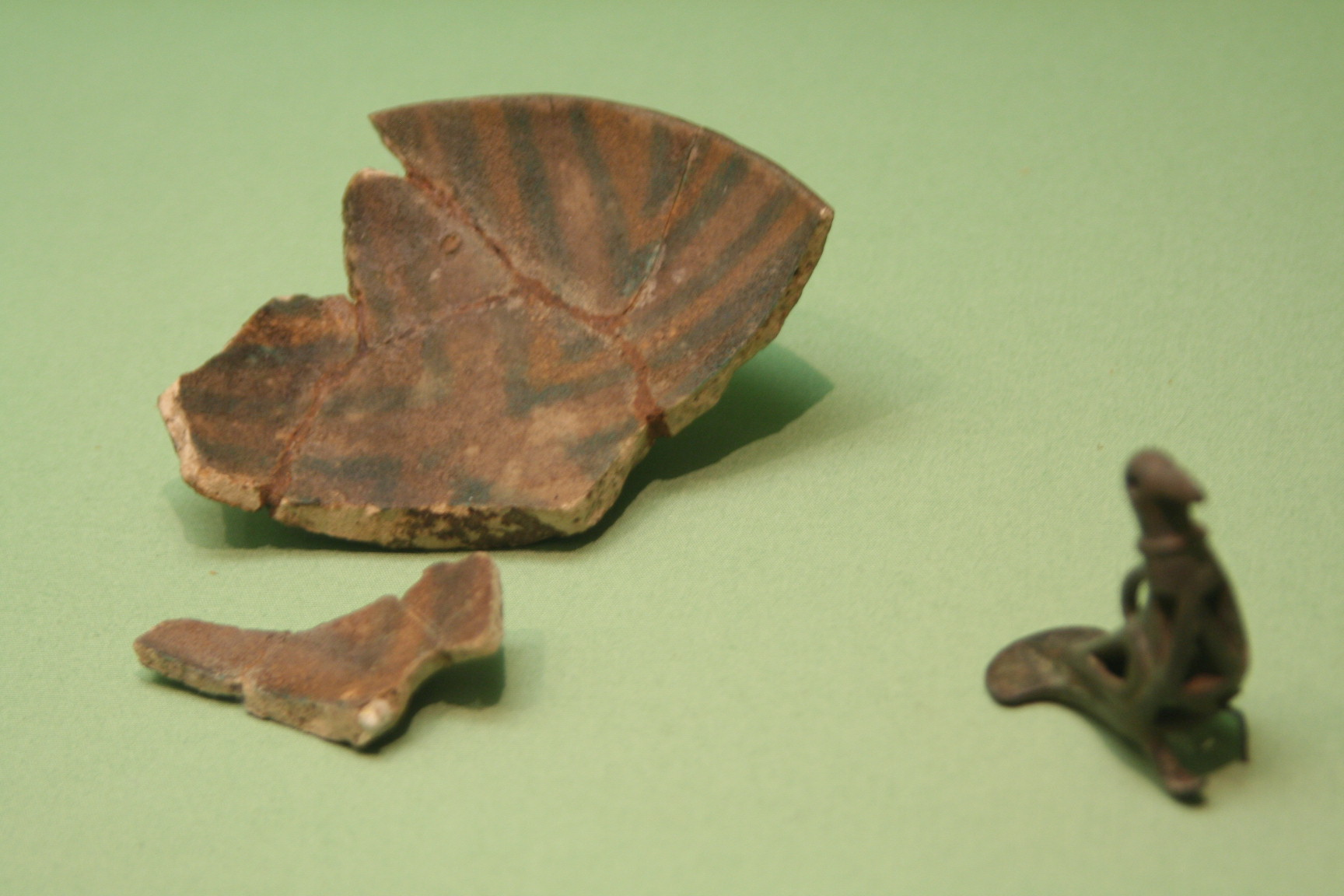
Bowl (clay, painted green and yellow) and bird-shaped pendant (bronze)

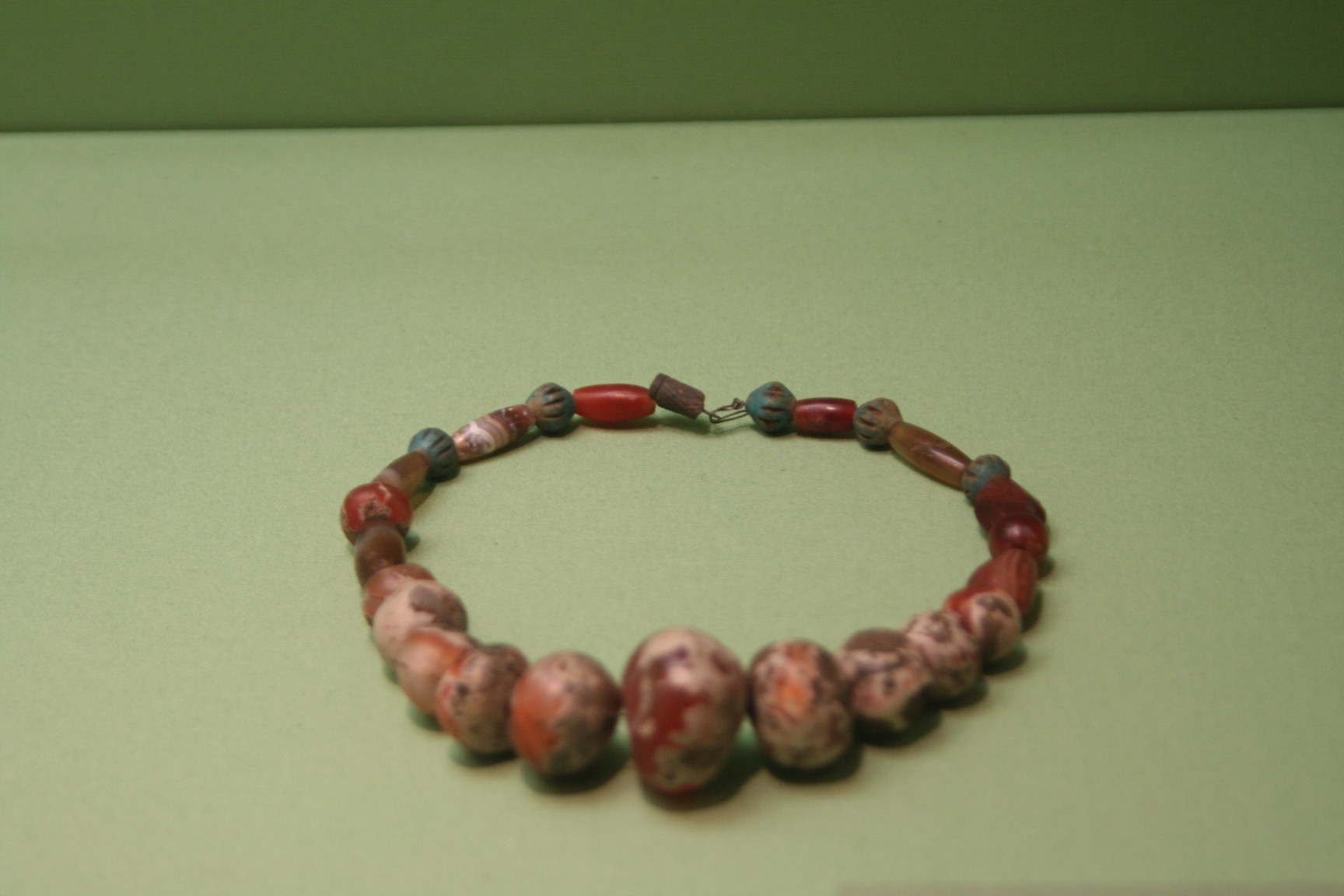
Necklace (agate, carnelian, paste)

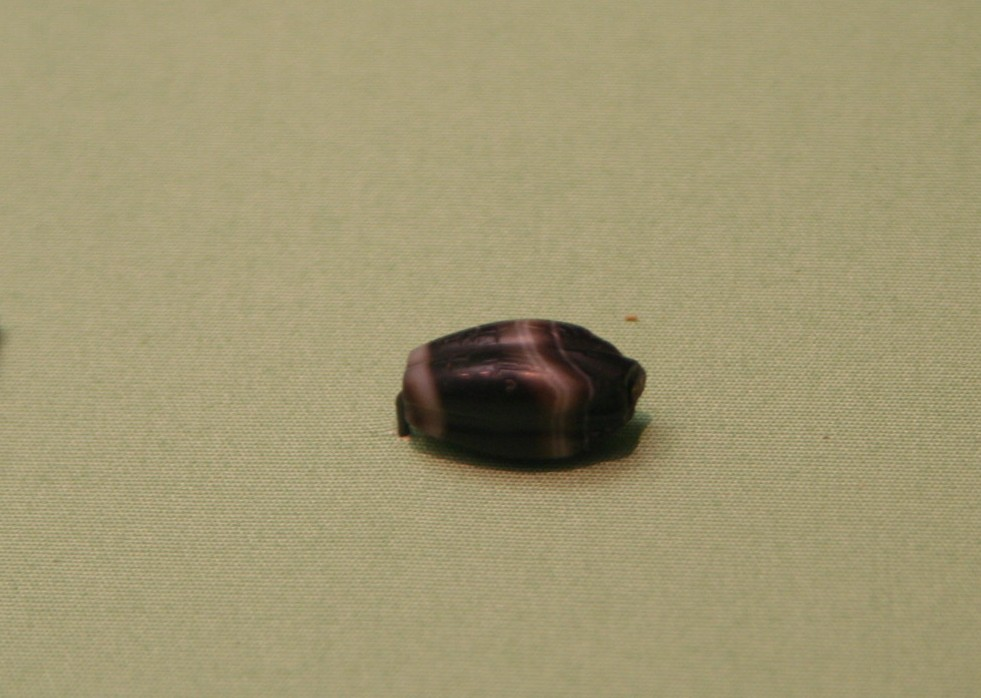
Bead (agate). Cuneiform inscription of the Assyrian King Adad-nirari II (911-891 BC): "Palace of Adadnirari, king of the world".
