= Ararat Plain =

Plain in the Armenian Highlands

Coordinates: 40.04°N 44.33°E

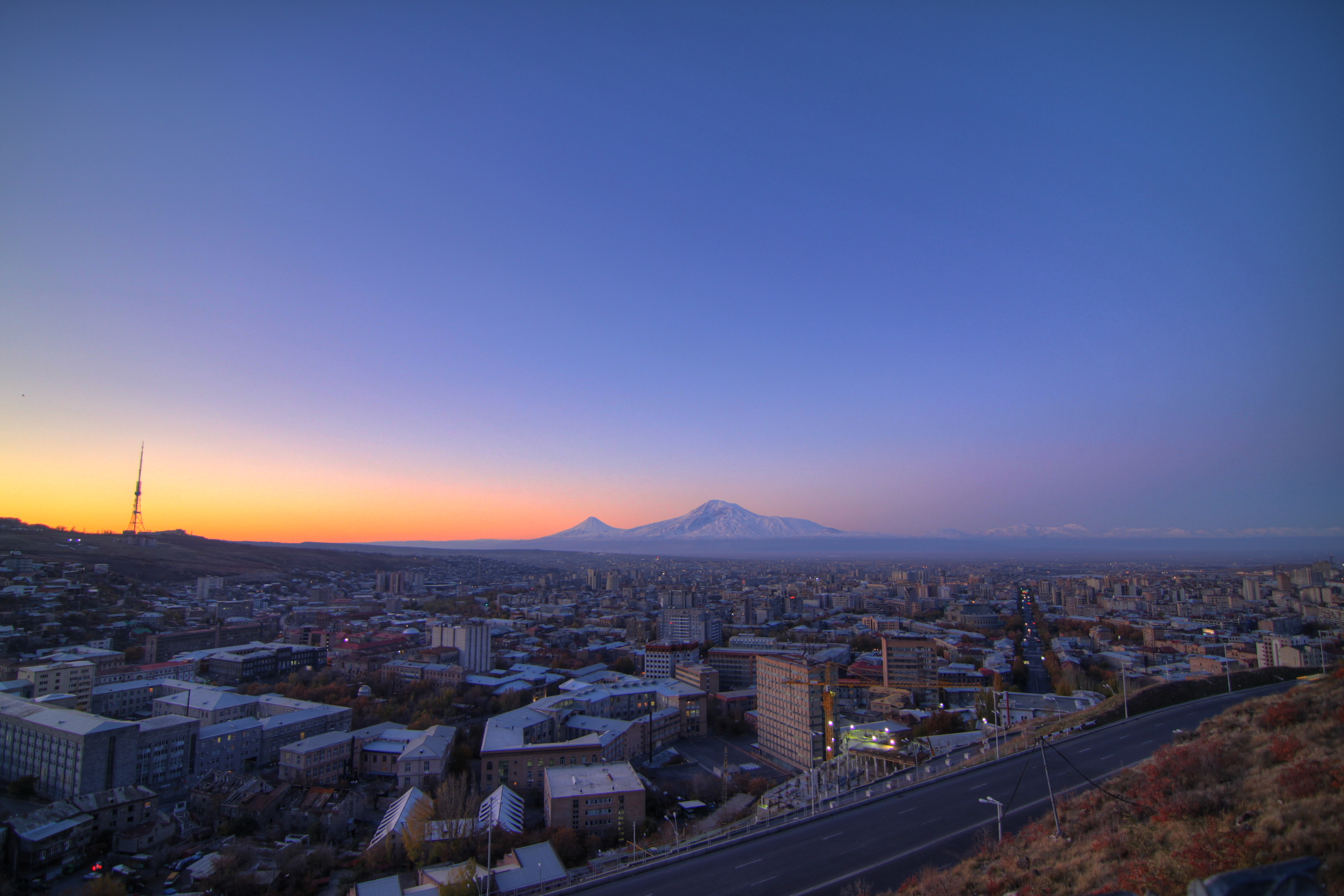
View of the Ararat plain from Yerevan

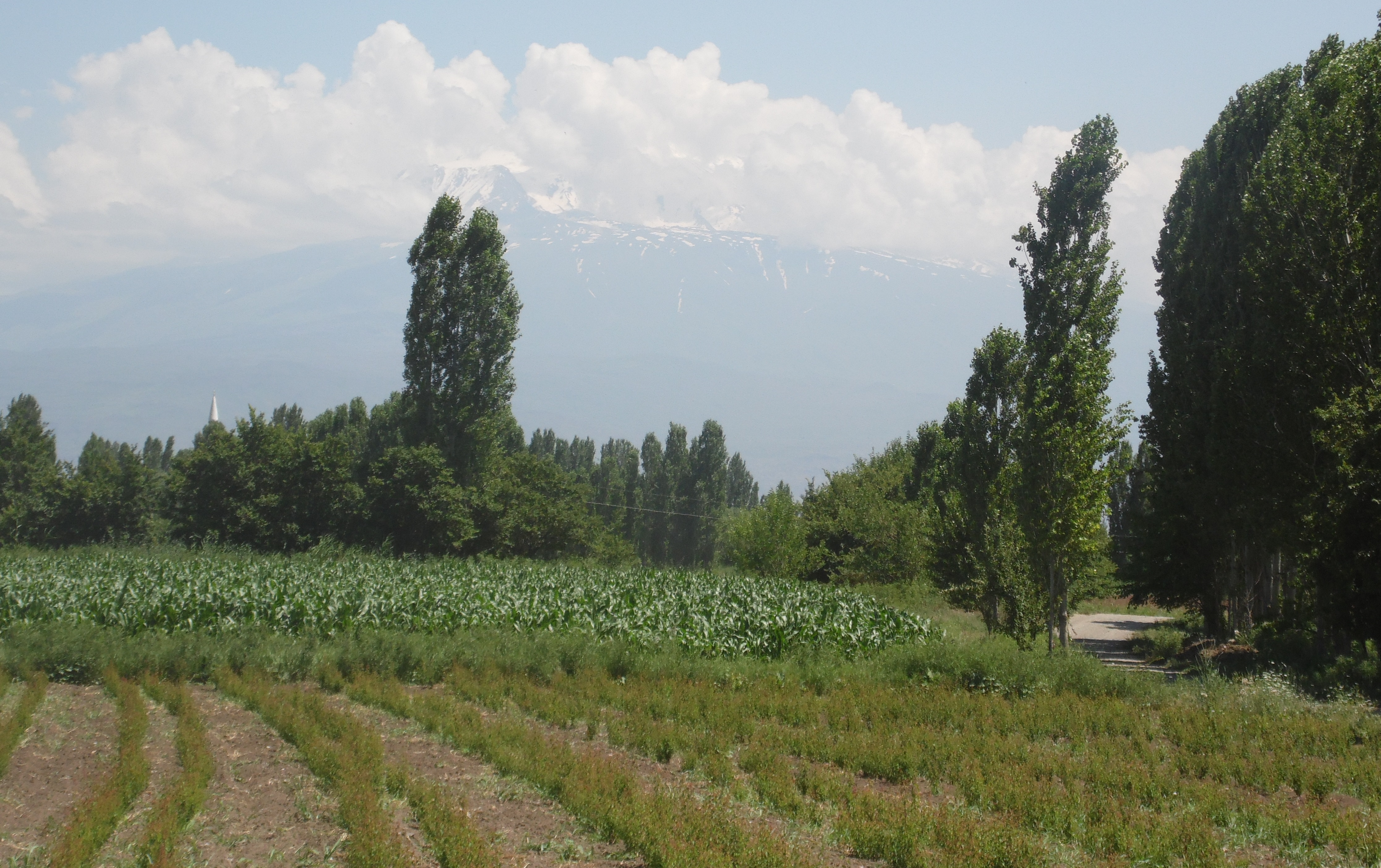
View of the Iğdır plain from Iğdır

The Ararat Plain (Armenian: Արարատյան դաշտ, romanized: Araratyan dasht (Note: Classical spelling: Արարատեան դաշտ)), called Iğdır Plain in Turkey (Turkish: Iğdır Ovası), is one of the largest plains of the Armenian Highlands. It stretches west of the Sevan basin, at the foothills of the Gegham mountains. In the north, the plain borders on Mount Aragats, and Mount Ararat in the south.

It is divided into two sections by the Aras River, the northern part located in Armenia, and the southern part in modern Turkey. The Turkish part of the plain is an Important Bird Area.

== Etymology ==
The medieval Armenian historian Movses Khorenatsi recorded in his History of Armenia that the Ararat Plain was named after King Ara the Handsome, the great-grandson of Amasya.

== Climate ==
The climate of the Ararat Plain is continental and semi-arid with hot summers and cold winters. The annual precipitation is about 200-250 mm. Rainfall is rare in summer. In winter, precipitation usually falls as snow. The Ararat Plain and the Lake Sevan basin experience abundant sunshine and are the sunniest areas in Armenia, receiving about 2,700 hours of sunshine a year. The shortest duration of sunshine is in the mid-mountain areas of the forest zone (about 2,000 hours). In the foothills, there is rarely a sunless day between the months of June and October.

== Agriculture ==
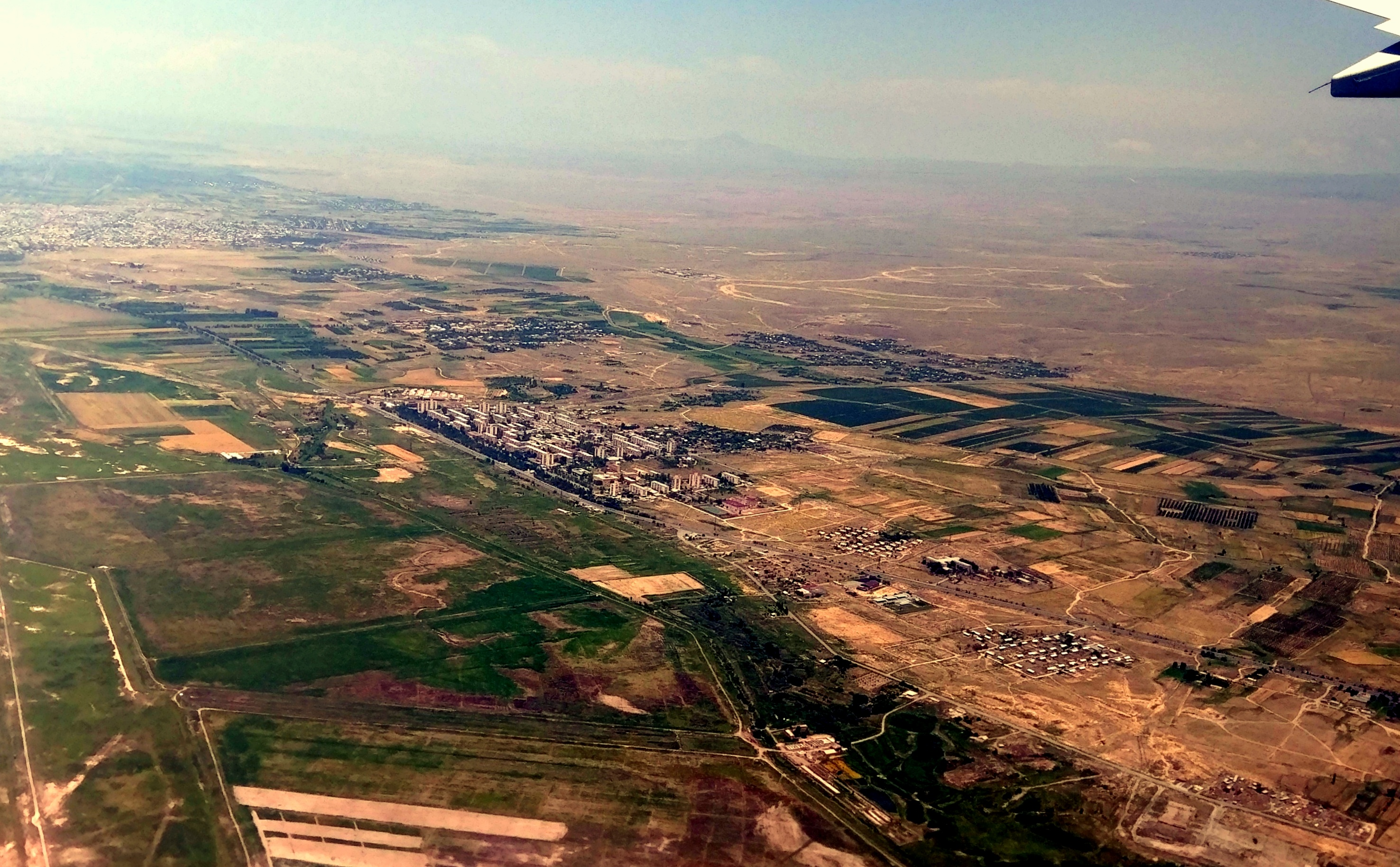
Aerial view of the Ararat plain around Metsamor and Armavir

The Ararat Plain makes up 4% of Armenia's total land area, but yields 40% of the country's farm production. In the Turkish part of the plain, apricot is widely produced on a 1,525 ha-area.

== Archaeology ==
This area has been inhabited since the Neolithic or the Early Chalcolithic times. The name 'Armenia' is written for the first time in history in the 24th-23rd centuries B.C. in the Mesopotamian cuneiform inscriptions in the form 'Armani', while in the text of the same period discovered in Ebla (Syria) Armenia is called 'Armi'.

At Aratashen, the first pottery appears at the end of the fifth millennium BC, or before 4000 BC.

== Notable people ==
- Vazgen Tevanyan, freestyle wrestler and European champion

== Gallery ==
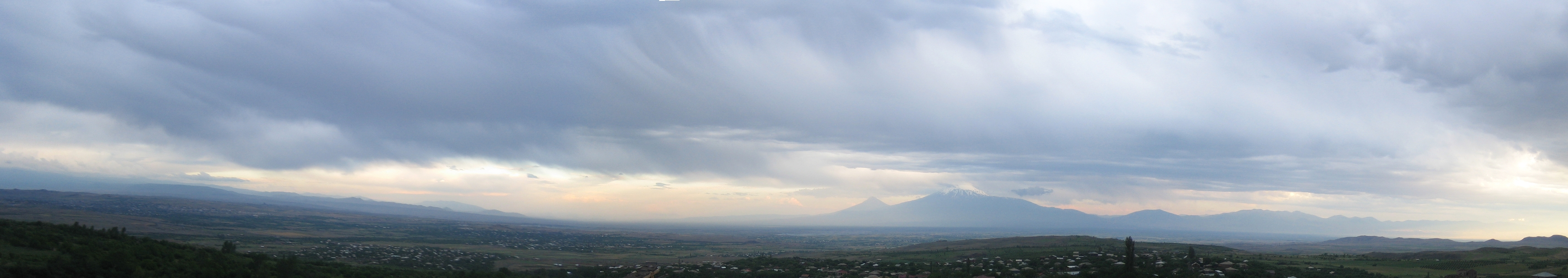
Panorama of the Ararat plain as seen from Dzorap, Armenia.

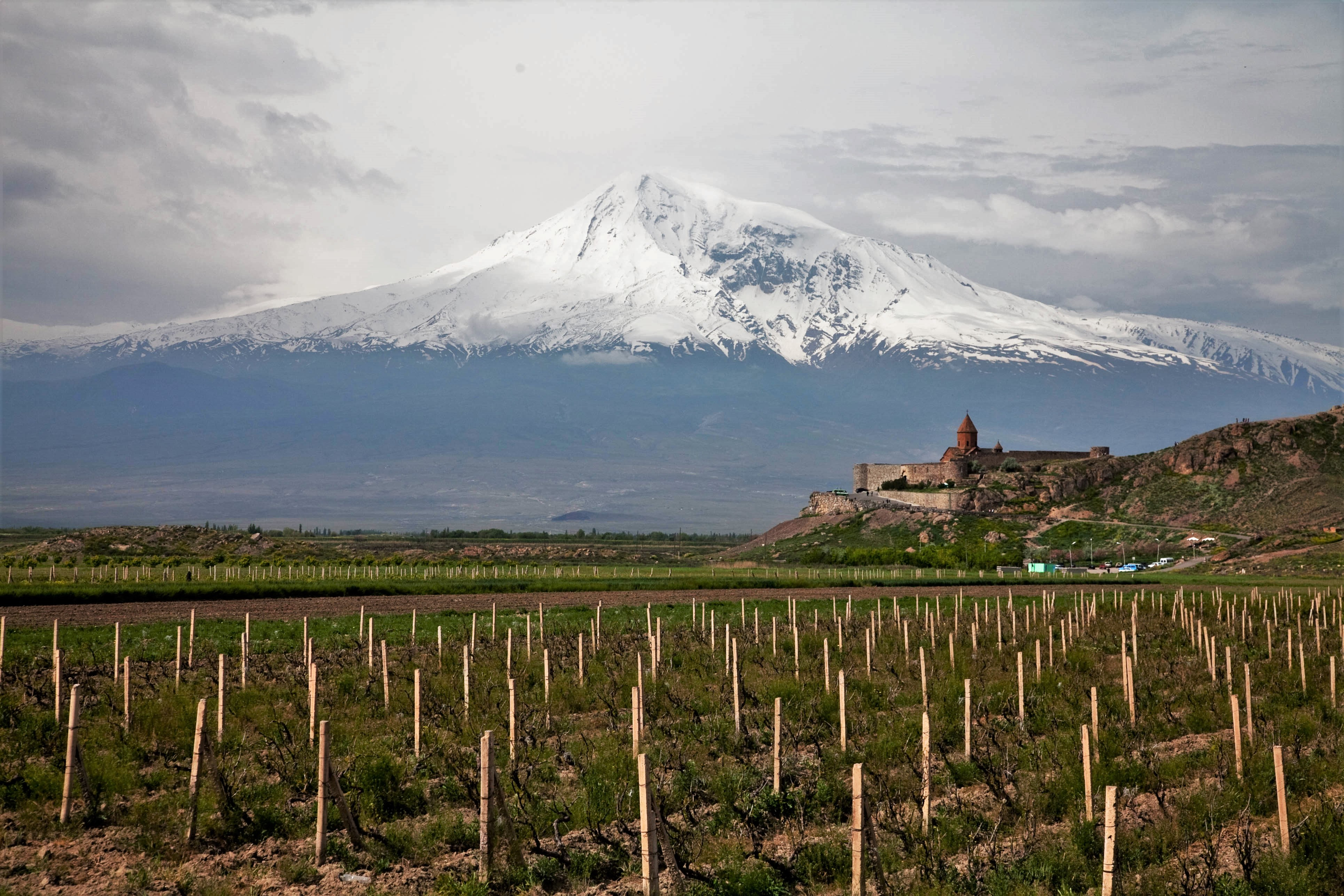
Khor Virap Monastery, Armenia, and Mount Ararat.

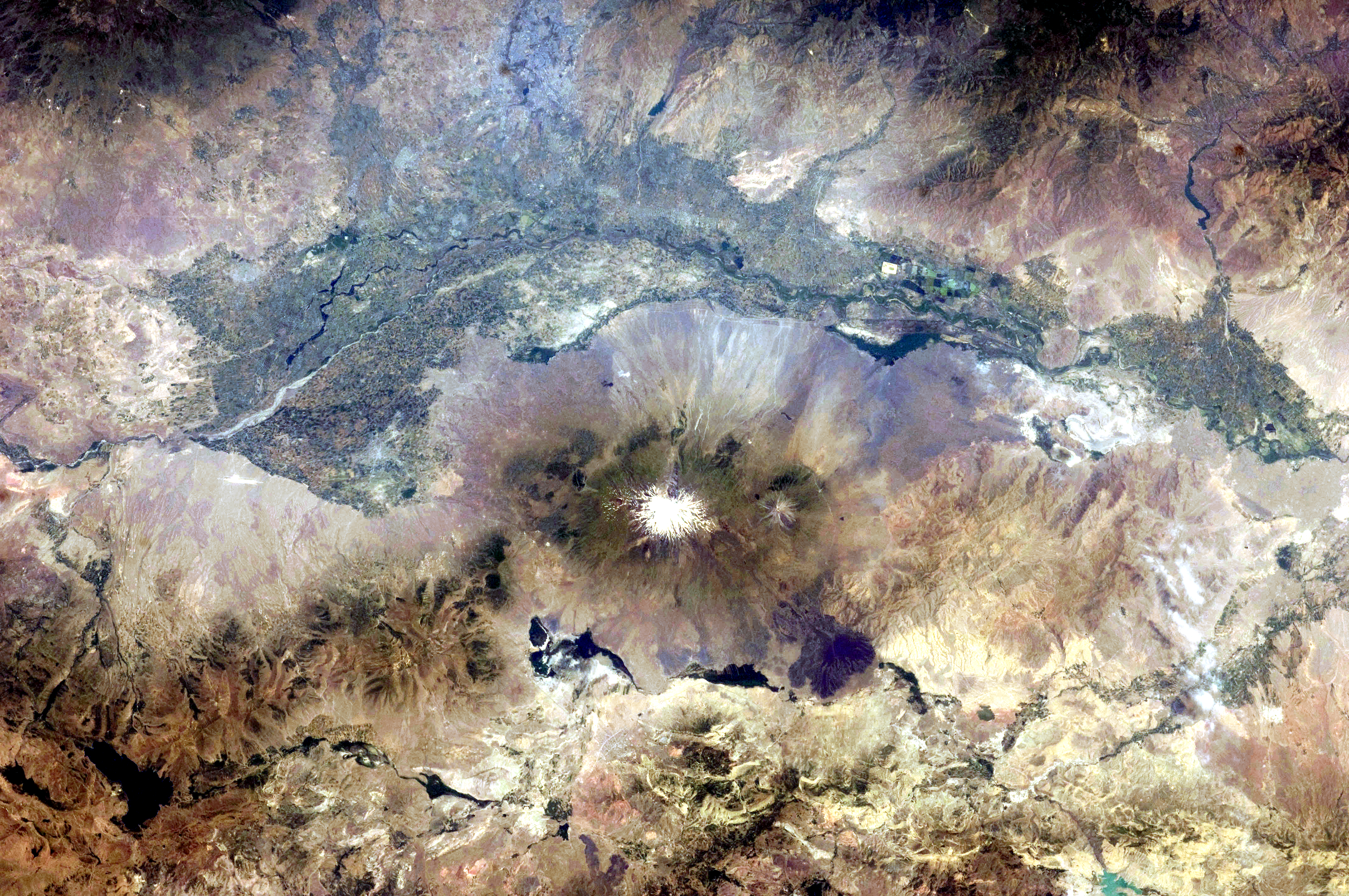
Satellite image

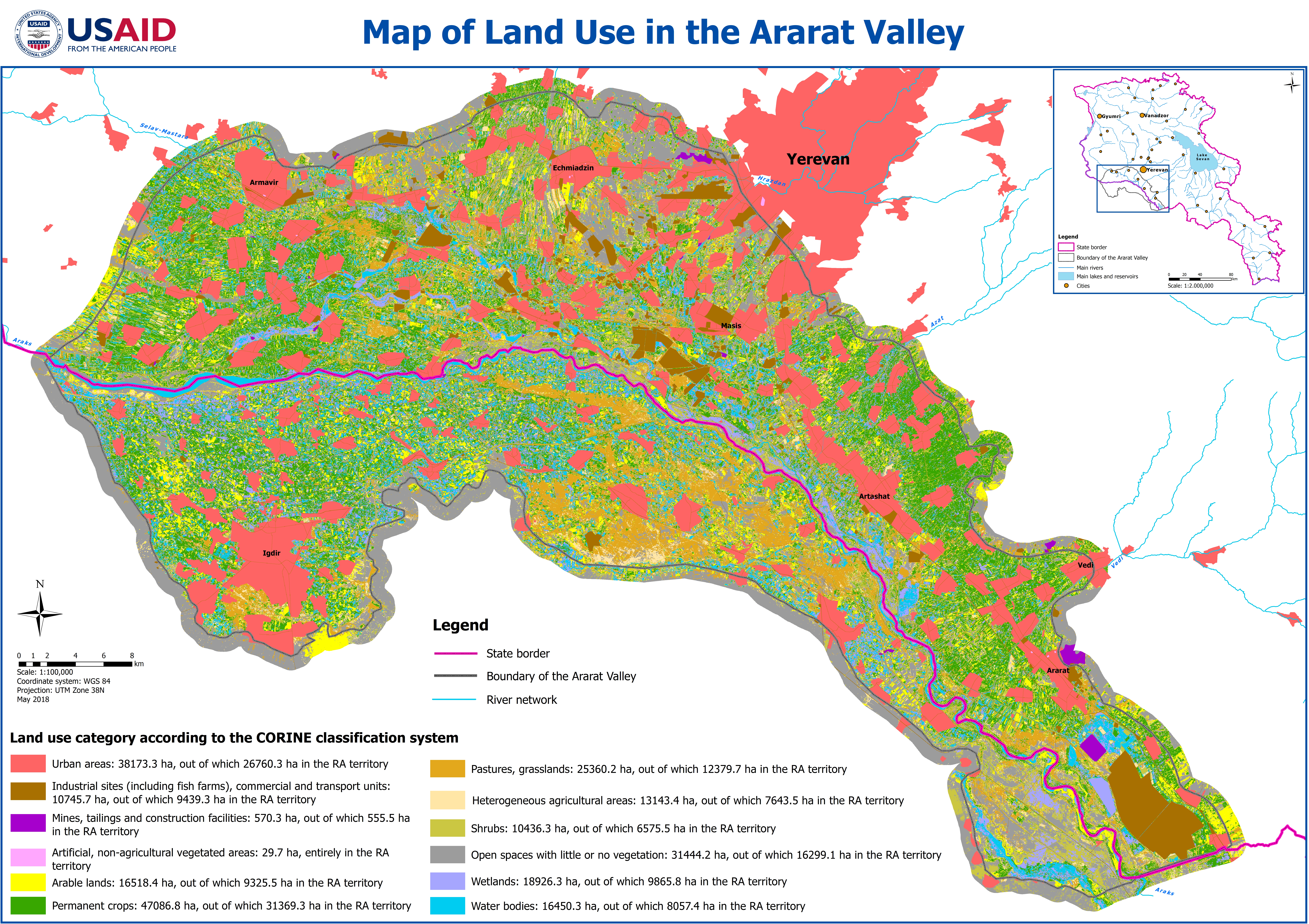
Map of Ararat Plain and its land use.
