= Origin of the Azerbaijanis =

The Azerbaijanis or Azeris are a Turkic ethnic group of mixed ethnic origins, primarily the indigenous peoples of eastern Transcaucasia, the Medians, an ancient Iranian people, and the Oghuz Turkic tribes that began migrating to Azerbaijan in the 11th century CE. (Note: A) "..and the Medes (Iranians of what is now north-west Iran).." EIEC (1997:30). B) "Archaeological evidence for the religion of the Iranian-speaking Medes of the ..". C) ".. succeeded in uniting into a kingdom the many Median tribes" (from Encyclopædia Britannica). D) "Proto-Iranian split into Western (Median, and others) and Eastern (Scythian, Ossetic, Saka, Pamir and others)..." (Kuz'mina, Elena E. (2007), The origin of the Indo-Iranians, J. P. Mallory (ed.), BRILL, p. 303, ISBN 978-90-04-16054-5)) Modern Azerbaijanis are the second most numerous ethnic group among the Turkic peoples after Anatolian Turks and speak North Azerbaijani (spoken mainly in the Republic of Azerbaijan and Russia) and/or South Azerbaijani (spoken in Iran, Iraq, and Syria). Both languages also have dialects, with 21 North Azerbaijani dialects and 11 South Azerbaijani dialects.

The Azerbaijani are of mixed ethnic origin, the oldest element deriving from the indigenous population of eastern Transcaucasia and possibly from the Medians of northern Persia. Between the 3rd and 7th centuries CE, there was a Persianization of the population, during the period of the Sassanian dynasty. A subsequent Turkification of the population occurred after the region's conquest by the Seljuq Turks in the 11th century and a continued influx of Turkic peoples over subsequent centuries – including groups that migrated during the Mongol conquests of the 13th century (most of the tribes that formed the Mongol forces, or were led by them to migrate were Turkic peoples.)

== Caucasian substrate ==
The Caucasian origin of the Azerbaijanis defines a link between Azerbaijanis and their pre-Turkification Caucasian past and mostly applies to the Azerbaijanis of the Caucasus, most of whom are now inhabitants of what is now the Republic of Azerbaijan. There is evidence that, due to repeated invasions and migrations, aboriginal Caucasians were culturally assimilated, first by Iranians, such as the Alans, and later by the Oghuz Turks. Considerable information has been learned about the Caucasian Albanians including their language, history, early conversion to Christianity, and close ties to the Armenians. Many academics believe that the Udi language, still spoken in Azerbaijan, is a remnant of the Albanians' language.

This Caucasian influence extended further south into Iranian Azerbaijan. During the 1st millennium BCE, another Caucasian people, the Mannaeans (Mannai) populated much of this area. This ancient country was in northwestern Iran, south of Lake Urmia. During the period of its existence in the early 1st millennium BCE, Mannai was surrounded by three major powers: Assyria, Urartu, and Media. With the intrusion of the Scythians and the rise of the Medes in the 7th century, the Manneans lost their identity and were subsumed under the term Medes.

=== Genetic testing ===
Although genetic testing demonstrates that the genetic heritage of Azerbaijani Turks is mostly from the native populations of the Middle East and the Caucasus, rather than their being direct descendants of migrants from Central Asia, it does, however, show that the region is a genetically mixed one. Whereas the population of Azerbaijan is culturally diverse, genetic testing has revealed common genetic markers that support an autochthonous (indigenous) background for most Azerbaijani Turks. MtDNA analysis indicates that the main relationship with Iranians is through a larger West Eurasian group that is secondary to that of the Caucasus, according to a study that did not include Azerbaijani Turks, but Georgians who have clustered with Azerbaijani Turks in other studies. The conclusion from the testing shows that Azerbaijani Turks of the republic are a mixed population with relationships, in order of greatest similarity, with the Caucasus, Iranians and Near Easterners, Europeans, and Turkmen. Other genetic analysis of mtDNA (maternal) and Y-chromosomes (paternal) indicates that Caucasian populations are genetically intermediate between Europeans and Near Easterners, but that they are more closely related to Near Easterners overall. Another study, conducted in 2003 by the Russian Journal of Genetics, compared Iranian-language speakers of the Republic of Azerbaijan (the Talysh and Tats) with Turkic Azerbaijanis and found that the genetic structure of those populations, compared with the other Iranian-speaking populations (Persians from Iran, Ossetins, and Tajiks), was closer to Turkic Azerbaijanis than to Iranian-speaking populations elsewhere.

In 2006, M. Regueiro and A.M. Cadenas of Stanford University showed that the population of central Iran (Isfahan) was closer to Caucasian Azerbaijani people than to the population of Turkey in terms of haplogroup distributions and genetic homogeneity.

The latest comparative study (2013) on the complete mitochondrial DNA diversity in Iranians has indicated that Iranian Azerbaijanis are more related to the people of Georgia than they are to other Iranians and to Armenians. However, the same multidimensional scaling plot shows that Azerbaijanis from the Caucasus, despite their supposed common origin with Iranian Azerbaijanis, cluster closer with other Iranians (e.g. Persians, etc.) than they do with Iranian Azerbaijanis.

Azerbaijani Turks, however, are still demonstrated to possess significant genetic influences from East Asia relative to their non-Turkic neighbors.

== Iranian substrate ==
The Iranian origin of the Azerbaijanis defines a link between present-day Azerbaijanis and their Azari past and mostly applies to Iranian Azerbaijanis. Although the Azeri people are known to be Turkic, their ancestral roots go back to Indo-Iranian tribes and ethnic groups. It is supported by historical accounts, by the existence of the Old Azari language, present-day place names, cultural similarities between Iranian peoples and Azerbaijanis, and archaeological and ethnical evidence. It is also favored by notable scholars and sources, such as Vladimir Minorsky, Richard Frye, Xavier De Planhol, Encyclopaedia of Islam, Encyclopædia Iranica, Encyclopædia Britannica, Grand Dictionnaire Encyclopedique Larousse, and World Book Encyclopedia.

=== Historical accounts and the ancient Azari language ===
According to Vladimir Minorsky, around the 9th and 10th centuries:

"The original sedentary population of Azarbayjan consisted of a mass of peasants and at the time of the Arab conquest was compromised under the semi-contemptuous term of Uluj ("non-Arab")-somewhat similar to the raya (*ri'aya) of the Ottoman empire. The only arms of this peaceful rustic population were slings, see Tabari, II, 1379-89. They spoke a number of dialects (Adhari(Azari), Talishi) of which even now there remains some islets surviving amidst the Turkish speaking population. It was this basic population on which Babak leaned in his revolt against the caliphate.

Professor Ighrar Aliyev also mentions that the Arab historians Baladhuri, Masudi, Ibn Hawqal and Yaqut have mentioned this language by name. Medieval historians and scholars also record the people of the region of Azerbaijan as Iranians who spoke Iranian languages. Among these are Al-Istakhri, Al-Masudi, Ibn al-Nadim, Hamzeh Esfahani, Ibn Hawqal, Al-Baladhuri, Moqaddasi, Yaghubi, Hamdallah Mostowfi, and Al-Khwarizmi.

Ebn al-Moqaffa' (d. 142/759) is quoted by ibn Al-Nadim in his famous Al-Fihrist as stating that Azerbaijan, Nahavand, Rayy, Hamadan and Esfahan speak Pahlavi (Fahlavi) and collectively constitute the region of Fahlah.

A very similar statement is given by the medieval historian Hamzeh Isfahani when talking about Sassanid Iran. Hamzeh Isfahani writes in the book Al-Tanbih 'ala Hoduth alTashif that five "tongues" or dialects, were common in Sassanian Iran: Pahlavi (Fahlavi), Dari, Parsi (Farsi), Khuzi and Soryani. Hamzeh (893-961 A.D.) explains these dialects in the following way:

Pahlavi (Fahlavi) was a dialect which kings spoke in their assemblies and it is related to Fahleh. This name is used to designate five cities of Iran, Esfahan, Rey, Hamadan, Man Nahavand, and Azerbaijan. Parsi (Farsi) is a dialect which was spoken by the clergy (Zoroastrian) and those who associated with them and is the language of the cities of Pars (Fars). Dari is the dialect of the cities of Ctesiphon and was spoken in the kings' /dabariyan/ 'courts'. The root of its name is related to its use; /darbar/ 'court* is implied in /dar/. The vocabulary of the natives of Balkh was dominant in this language, which includes the dialects of the eastern peoples. Khuzi is associated with the cities of Khuzistan where kings and dignitaries used it in private conversation and during leisure time, in the bath houses for instance.

Ibn Hawqal mentions that some areas of Armenia are controlled by Muslims and others by Christians.

Al-Moqaddasi (died late 4th century AH/10th century CE) considers Azerbaijan as part of the 8th division of lands. He states: "The languages of the 8th division is Iranian (al-'ajamyya). It is partly Dari and partly convoluted (monqaleq) and all of them are named Persian".

Al-Moqaddasi also writes on the general region of Armenia, Arran and Azerbaijan. Ahmad ibn Yaqubi mentions that the "People of Azerbaijan are a mixture of 'Ajam-i Azari (Ajam is a term that developed to mean Iranian) of Azaris and old Javedanis (followers of Javidan the son of Shahrak who was the leader of Khurramites and succeeded by Babak Khorramdin)."

Zakarrya b. Moháammad Qazvini's report in Athar al-Bilad, composed in 674/1275, that "no town has escaped being taken over by the Turks except Tabriz" (Beirut ed., 1960, p. 339) one may infer that at least Tabriz had remained aloof from the influence of Turkish until the time.

From the time of the Mongol invasion, most of whose armies were composed of Turkic tribes, the influence of Turkish increased in the region. On the other hand, the old Iranian dialects remained prevalent in major cities. Hamdallah Mostawafi writing in the 1340s calls the language of Maraqa as "modified Pahlavi"(Pahlavi-ye Mughayyar). Mostowafi calls the language of Zanjan (Pahlavi-ye Raast). The language of Gushtaspi covering the Caspian border region between Gilan to Shirvan is called a Pahlavi language close to the language of Gilan.

Even after the Turkic invasions and subsequent Turkification of the area, which lasted several centuries, travelers and scholars cited Persian being used up to the 17th century in Tabriz. Even the Ottoman Turkish explorer Evliya Çelebi (1611–1682) mentions this in his Seyahatname. He also reports that the elite and learned people of Nakhichevan and Maragheh spoke Pahlavi, during his tours of the region. Additionally, the old Pahlavi-based language of Azerbaijan is now extinct.

Also, the Brockhaus and Efron Encyclopedic Dictionary, published in 1890, writes that Azerbaijani's are only linguistically Turkic and Iranians by race. The book Man, published in 1901, comes to the same conclusion.

=== Modern opinions ===
Professor Richard Frye also states:

The Turkish speakers of Azerbaijan (q.v.) are mainly descended from the earlier Iranian speakers, several pockets of whom still exist in the region. A massive migration of Oghuz Turks in the 11th and 12th centuries gradually Turkified Azerbaijan as well as Anatolia. The Azeri Turks are Shiʿites and were founders of the Safavid dynasty. They are settled, although there are pastoralists in the Moḡān steppe called Ilsevan (formerly Šāhsevan) numbering perhaps 100,000; they, as other tribes in Iran, were forced to adopt a settled life under Reza Shah.

According to Professor Xavier De Planhol:

Azeri material culture, a result of this multi-secular symbiosis, is thus a subtle combination of indigenous elements and nomadic contributions, but the ratio between them remains to be determined. The few researches undertaken (Planhol, 1960) demonstrate the indisputable predominance of Iranian tradition in agricultural techniques (irrigation, rotation systems, terraced cultivation) and in several settlement traits (winter troglodytism of people and livestock, evident in the widespread underground stables). The large villages of Iranian peasants in the irrigated valleys have worked as points for crystallization of the newcomers even in the course of linguistic transformation; these places have preserved their sites and transmitted their knowledge. The toponymy, with more than half of the place names of Iranian origin in some areas, such as the Sahand, a huge volcanic massif south of Tabriz, or the Qara Dagh, near the border (Planhol, 1966, p. 305; Bazin, 1982, p. 28) bears witness to this continuity. The language itself provides eloquent proof. Azeri, not unlike Uzbek (see above), lost the vocal harmony typical of Turkish languages. It is a Turkish language learned and spoken by Iranian peasants.

Prof. Gernot Windfuhr states that "the majority of those who now speak Kurdish most likely were formerly speakers of a Median dialect."

Professor. Tadeusz Swietochowski states: "According to the most widely accepted etymology, the name "Azerbaijan" is derived from Atropates, the name of a Persian satrap of the late fourth century b.c. Another theory traces the origin of the name to the Persian word azar ("fire"') – hence Azerbaijan, "the Land of Fire", because of Zoroastrian temples, with their fires fueled by plentiful supplies of oil. Azerbaijan maintained its national character after its conquest by the Arabs in the mid-seventh century a.d. and its subsequent conversion to Islam. At this time it became a province in the early Muslim empire. Only in the 11th century, when Oghuz Turkic tribes under the Seljuk dynasty entered the country, did Azerbaijan acquire a significant number of Turkic inhabitants. The original Persian population became fused with the Turks, and gradually the Persian language was supplanted by a Turkic dialect that evolved into the distinct Azerbaijani language. The process of Turkification was long and complex, sustained by successive waves of incoming nomads from Central Asia.

=== Place names, culture, and archaeological evidence ===
The terms "Azeri" and "Azerbaijani" were born only in the 20th century upon the formation of the short-lived Republic of Azerbaijan in 1918, prior to which they were referred to as Tatars.

Many place names in the present-day Republic of Azerbaijan and Iranian Azerbaijan have Persian roots. Tabriz, Baku, Absheron, Ganja, and the country (as well as people) name itself Azerbaijan, are just a few examples. Also, many of the cities in these regions were founded before Turkic tribes reached the area. The first mention of Baku was in 885, before the Turkic invasions of the 10th and 11th centuries.

Archaeological evidence from these regions shows a large influence of Zoroastrianism, a monotheistic Iranian religion, along with an Iranian presence of more than 3000 years, starting with the settlement of the Medes in the area, both of which shaped the Iranian identity of the region that lasted until the Turkic invasions. However, no evidence has been discovered that the Huns ever created permanent settlements in the area, as some Turkish historians claim.

Scholars see cultural similarities between modern Persians and Azerbaijanis as evidence of an ancient Iranian influence. Azerbaijani's celebrate a number of Iranian holidays, most notably Norouz. Researchers also describe the lives of Azerbaijani villagers and Persian villagers to be very similar in terms of tradition and culture. The literature of the region was also written in Persian, with writers such as Qatran Tabrizi, Shams Tabrizi, Nezami, and Khaghani, writing in Persian prior to and during the Oghuz invasions.

Also, remnants of former Iranian tribes that survived Turkification also provides evidence of the Iranian character of Azerbaijani's. The Talyshs and Tats are both an Iranian people who speak Iranian languages, with Tats speaking a dialect of Persian.

=== Genetics ===
Some new genetic studies suggest that recent erosion of human population structure might not be as important as previously thought, and overall genetic structure of human populations may not change with the immigration events and thus in the Azerbaijanis' case; the Azerbaijanis of the Azerbaijan Republic most of all genetically resemble to other Caucasian people like Armenians, and the people of the Iranian Azerbaijan region to other Iranians.

A study from 2007 demonstrated a "strong genetic tie between Kurds and Azerbaijanis of Iran", with the results of the analysis of molecular variance (AMOVA) from the same study having "revealed no significant difference between these two populations and other major ethnic groups of Iran."

In another study from 2017, Iranian Azerbaijani subjects from Tabriz were studied for human leukocyte antigen (HLA) alleles, which were used to compare their relatedness with other Middle Eastern, Caucasian, Mediterranean and Central Asian populations. According to the study, "genetic distances, Neighbour Joining and Correspondence analyses showed that Iranian Azerbaijanis were close to Kurds, who have shown a closer Mediterranean/Caucasus HLA profile, and Gorgan (Turkmen) who have shown a closer Central Asia profile".

It was noted that studies on genetic distances based on both HLA allele and class II haplotype frequencies "place Azerbaijani sample in the Mediterranean cluster close to Kurds, Gorgan, Chuvash (South Russia, towards North Caucasus), Iranians and Caucasian populations (Svan and Georgians)". The study further showed that the Azerbaijanis are "close to Iranian populations like Baloch and Iranians from Yazd, Gorgan Turkmen and Kurds (the closest population according to plain genetic distances), but in a half-way position between Mediterraneans and Western and Central Siberians, such as Mansi or Todja, together with Gorgan, Kurds and Chuvash (South Russian towards North Caucasus)." The study explained the close affinity of Azerbaijani samples with the Kurdish samples due to geography, "since Kurds from Iran sample were taken from Iran province of Kurdistan which is quite below or Iran province of West Azerbaijan."

The neighbor joining (NJ) relatedness dendrogram based on HLA-DRB1 allele frequencies from the same study separated the various populations examined in the study in two well-differentiated clusters: the first cluster grouping North and South Mediterraneans (Europeans and Africans), Middle Easterners, Caucasians and western Siberians, and the second cluster grouping the rest of the analyzed populations (central and eastern Siberians and Orientals). Azerbaijanis were integrated in the first cluster, together with Gorgan (Iranian Turkmen population) and Kurds, and in an intermediate position between Iranian populations and western Siberians, namely the Chuvashes, Mansis, Buryats and Todja (Tozhu Tuvans). Correspondence analyses based on HLA-DRB1 allele frequencies showed similar results.

The HLA genetic distances observed in the study "presented low values in Altaic populations and Mansi with respect to Azerbaijanis, which are shown in a half-way position between Mediterranean and Central Asian, but much close to Todja, Tuvinians and Mansi, in correspondence analyses (Fig 3). These results suggest that "turkification" process caused by Oghuz Turkic tribes could also contribute to the genetic background of Azerbaijani people, as other genetic and historic data argue (Yarshater, 1988; Schonberg et al. 2011)."

The MtDNA subclade U7a4 peaks among the modern inhabitants of Azerbaijan (26%) and Azerbaijani inhabitants of northwestern Iran (16-22%), while occurring in the rest of Iran at frequencies from 2-16%.

According to generalized data from various laboratories, more than half of Azerbaijanis are carriers of Y-haplogroups of Near East origin (E-M35, G-P15, J-P209 and T-CTS6507), which confirms the hypothesis of Neolithic migrations from the Fertile Crescent. East European subclades of the Y-haplogroup R (R-Z2109, R-PF7562, R-Y4364) and haplogroups of Central Asian origin (C-M217, N-P43, O-F238, Q-M242, R-Z93, R-M478) totally cover more than a third of the studied and indicate migrations from eastern and northeastern geographical areas. Haplogroups of South Asian and West European origin were also identified, but with a rather low frequency.

=== Opposition ===
The Caucasus region is a mixed one. Though the population of Azerbaijan is culturally diverse, genetic testing has revealed common genetic markers that support an autochthonous background for most Azerbaijanis. A 2002 study found that: "Y-chromosome haplogroups indicate that Indo-European-speaking Armenians and Turkic-speaking Azerbaijanians from the republic are genetically more closely related to their geographic neighbors in the Caucasus than to their linguistic neighbors elsewhere." The authors of this study suggest that this indicates a language replacement of indigenous Caucasian peoples. There is evidence of limited genetic admixture derived from Central Asians (specifically Haplogroup H12), notably the Turkmen, which is higher than that of their neighbors, the Georgians and Armenians. MtDNA analysis indicates that the main relationship with Iranians is through a larger West Eurasian group that is secondary to that of the Caucasus, according to a study that did not include Azerbaijanis, but Georgians who have clustered with Azerbaijanis in other studies. The conclusion from the testing shows that the Azerbaijanis are a mixed population with relationships, in order of greatest similarity, with the Caucasus, Iranians and Near Easterners, Europeans, and Turkmen. Other genetic analysis of mtDNA and Y-chromosomes indicates that Caucasian populations are genetically intermediate between Europeans and Near Easterners, but that they are more closely related to Near Easterners overall. Another study, conducted in 2003 by the Russian Journal of Genetics, compared Iranian-language speakers in Azerbaijan (the Talysh and Tats) with Turkic-language Azerbaijanis and found that, "... the genetic structure of the populations examined with the other Iranian-speaking populations (Persians and Kurds from Iran, Ossetins, and Tajiks) and Azerbaijanis showed that Iranian-speaking populations from Azerbaijan were more close to Azerbaijanis, than to Iranian-speaking populations inhabiting other world regions."

Ancient historians, including Herodotus, Polybius, and Strabo, mention the region as a mixed one, with Iranian and non-Iranian groups, such as the Utians, a Caucasian group that still exists in Azerbaijan.

== Oghuz arrival ==
Ibn al-Athir, an Arab historian, declared that the Oghuz Turks had come to Transoxiana in the period of the caliph Al-Mahdi in the years between 775 and 785. In the period of the Abbasid caliph Al-Ma'mun (813 – 833), the name Oghuz starts to appear in the works of Islamic writers. By 780, the eastern parts of the Syr Darya were ruled by the Karluk Turks and the western region (Oghuz steppe) was ruled by the Oghuz Turks.

Oghuz dominance in Southwestern Asia begins in the 11th century, with the Seljuk Empire. The Southwestern Turkic dialects gradually supplanted the Tat, Azari, and Middle Persian dialects in northern Iran, and a variety of Caucasian languages in the Caucasus, particularly Udi, and had become the dominant during the High to Late Medieval period, under the rule of the Aq Qoyunlu and Qara Qoyunlu (14th to 15th centuries), the process of Turkification being mostly complete by the Safavid period (16th century).

== See also ==
- History of Azerbaijan
- Azerbaijanis
- Turkification
- Genetic history of the Turkish people
- Genetic history of Europe
- Genetic history of the Middle East
