= Prehistoric Malaysia =

Prehistoric human occupation of Malaysia

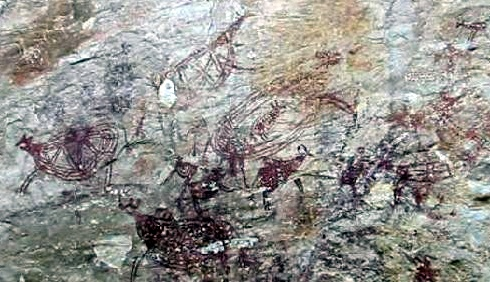
Tambun rock art, 2000 years old, in Ipoh, Perak, Malaysia.

The earliest anatomically modern human skeleton in Peninsular Malaysia, Perak Man, dates back 11,000 years and Perak Woman dating back 8,000 years, were both discovered in Lenggong. The site has an undisturbed stone tool production area, created using equipment such as anvils and hammer stones. The Tambun rock art is also situated in Ipoh, Perak. From East Malaysia, Sarawak's Niah Caves, there is evidence of the oldest human remains in Malaysia, dating back 40,000 years.

== Chronology ==
=== 235,000 years ago – Paleolithic (Early Stone Age) ===
The Niah Caves in Sarawak are an important prehistoric site where human remains dating to approximately 40,000 years ago have been found.

Archaeologists have claimed a much earlier date for stone tools discovered in the Mansuli Valley, near Lahad Datu, Sabah, dating from 235,000 to 3,000 years ago. This makes it the oldest valley in Borneo prehistory to have been chronometrically dated.

Studies in the Mansuli Valley, along with the discovery of other open sites in Sabah, marked a new phase in the prehistory of Malaysia, with both open and cave sites providing the earliest dates for prehistoric sites in Sabah. The cave site Samang Buat Cave is considered the oldest inhabited cave in Sabah and Borneo, dating back 46,000 years. The Mansuli open site is the oldest in Sabah and Borneo overall, dating back 235,000 years.

Findings at both sites provide a chronology of regional prehistory and indicate repeated habitation.

=== 10,000–5,000 years ago – Neolithic (New Stone Age) ===
Archaeological finds from the Lenggong Valley in Perak show that people were making stone tools and using jewellery. The archaeological data from this period came from cave and rock shelter sites and are associated with Hoabinhian hunter-gatherers. It is believed that Neolithic farmers arrived in this region between 3,000 and 4,000 years ago.

=== 2,500 years ago – Metal Age ===
More people arrived, including new tribes and seafaring Austronesians. The Malay Peninsula became a crossroads in the maritime trade of the ancient age. Seafarers who came to Malaysia's shores included Malayo-Polynesian people, Indians and possibly Chinese traders among others. Ptolemy named the Malay Peninsula the Golden Chersonese.

== Migration theories ==
=== Sundaland theory ===
A study from Leeds University published in Molecular Biology and Evolution, examining mitochondrial DNA lineages, suggested that humans had been occupying the islands of Southeast Asia for a longer period than previously believed. Population dispersals seem to have occurred at the same time as sea levels rose, which may have resulted in migrations from the Philippine Islands to as far north as Taiwan within the last 10,000 years. The population migrations were most likely to have been driven by climate change. Rising sea levels in three massive pulses may have caused flooding and the submerging of the Sunda continent, creating the Java and South China Seas and the thousands of islands that make up Indonesia and the Philippines today.

A 2009 genetic study published by the 2009 Human Genome Organization Pan-Asian SNP Consortium found that Asia was originally settled by humans via a single southern route. The migration came from Africa via India, into Southeast Asia and what are now islands in the Pacific, and then later up to the eastern and northern Asian mainland.

Genetic similarities were found between populations throughout Asia and an increase in genetic diversity from northern to southern latitudes. Although the Chinese population is large, it has less variation than the smaller number of individuals living in Southeast Asia, because the Chinese expansion occurred recently, following the development of rice agriculture – within only the last 10,000 years.

Oppenheimer locates the origin of the Austronesians in Sundaland and its upper regions. Genetic research reported in 2008 indicates that the islands which are the remnants of Sundaland were likely populated as early as 50,000 years ago, contrary to a previous hypothesis that they were populated as late as 10,000 years ago from Taiwan.

=== Yunnan migration theory ===
The theory of the Proto-Malay people originating from Yunnan is supported by R.H Geldern, J.H.C Kern, J.R Foster, J.R Logen, Slametmuljana, and Asmah Haji Omar. The Proto Malay (Melayu Asli) who first arrived had agricultural skills while the second wave Deutero Malay (mixed blood) who arrived around 1500 BC and dwelled along the coastlines had advanced fishery skills. During the migration, both groups intermarried with peoples of the southern islands, such as those from Java, and also with aboriginal peoples of Australo-Melanesian, Negrito and Melanesian origin.

Other evidence that supports this theory includes:

- Stone tools found in the Malay Archipelago are analogous to Central Asian tools.
- Similarities between Malay customs and Assamese customs.

=== Deutero Malays ===
Combination of the colonial Kambujas of Hindu-Buddhism faith, the Indo-Persian royalties and traders as well as traders from southern China and elsewhere along the ancient trade routes, these peoples together with the aborigine Negrito Orang Asli and native seafarers and Proto Malays intermarried each other's and thus a new group of peoples was formed and became known as the Deutero Malays, today they are commonly known as the Malays.

== Malay language ==
=== Oldest Malay text ===
According to most scholars the Đông Yên Châu inscription from around the 4th century AD was written in Old Cham is the oldest Malay text found. However, some believe the inscription to contain the oldest examples of Malay words. Chamic and Malayic languages are closely related; both are the two subgroups of a Malayic–Chamic group within the Malayo-Polynesian branch of the Austronesian family.

The Kedukan Bukit Inscription of 682 CE was found at Palembang, Indonesia.

=== Cham-Malay relation ===
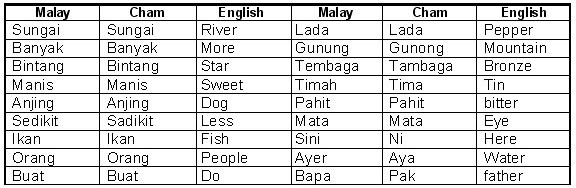
Malay & Cham languages.

The similarity of the Cambodian Cham language and the Malay language can be found in names of places such as Kampong Cham, Kambujadesa, Kampong Chhnang, etc. and Sejarah Melayu clearly mentioned a Cham community in Parameswara's Malacca around the 15th century. Cham is related to the Malayo-Polynesian languages of Malaysia, Indonesia, Madagascar and the Philippines. In the mid 15th century, when Cham was heavily defeated by the Vietnamese, some 120,000 were killed and in the 17th century the Champa king converted to Islam. In the 18th century the last Champa Muslim king Pô Chien gathered his people and migrated south to Cambodia while those along the coastline migrated to the nearest peninsula state Terengganu, approximately 500 km or less by boat, and Kelantan. Malaysian constitution recognises the Cham rights to Malaysian citizenship and their Bumiputera status. Now that the history is interlinked, there is a possibility that Parameswara's family were Cham refugees who fled to Palembang before he fled to Tumasik and finally to Malacca. One of the last Kings of Angkor of the Khmer Empire had the name Paramesvarapada.

== See also ==
- Early history of Burma
- Early history of Cambodia
- History of Southeast Asia
- Prehistoric Asia
- Prehistoric Indonesia
- Prehistoric Thailand

== Sources ==
- Nik Hassan Shuhaimi Nik Abdul Rahman (1998). The Encyclopedia of Malaysia : Early History, Volume 4. Archipelago Press. ISBN 981-3018-42-9. Archived from the original on 3 January 2007.
- Prof. Dato' Dr. Asmah Haji Omar (1998). The Encyclopedia of Malaysia : Languages and Literature, Volume 9. Archipelago Press. ISBN 981-3018-52-6. Archived from the original on 3 January 2007.
