= Early history of Cambodia =

Aspect of Cambodian history

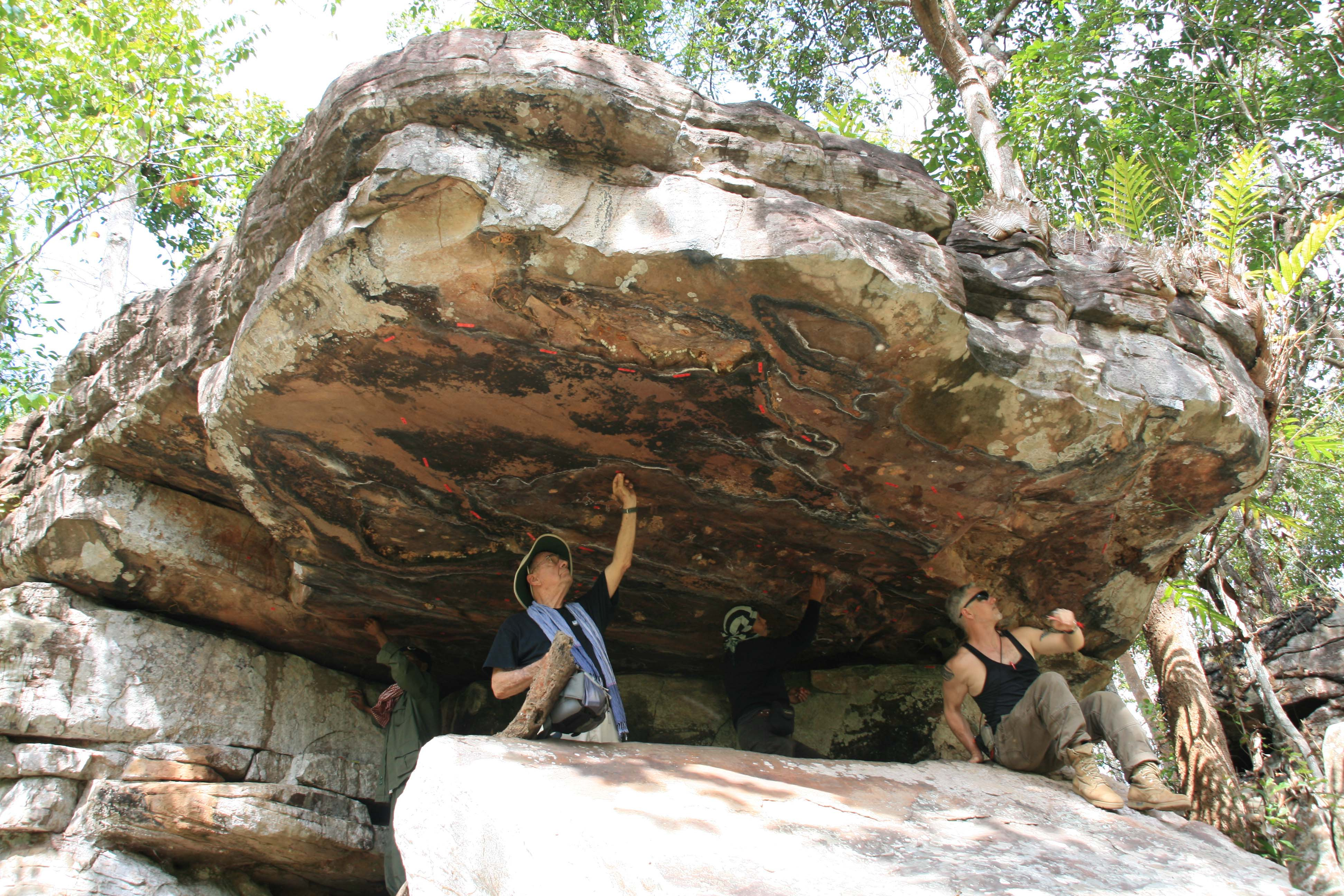
Archaeologists examine prehistoric cave paintings in Pursat province

The early history of Cambodia follows the prehistoric and protohistoric development of Cambodia as a country in mainland Southeast Asia. Thanks to archaeological work carried out since 2009, this can now be traced back to the Neolithic period. As excavation sites have become more numerous and modern dating methods are applied, settlement traces of all stages of human civil development from neolithic hunter-gatherer groups to organized preliterate societies are documented in the region.

Historical records of a political structure on territory that is now modern-day Cambodia first appear in Chinese annals in reference to Funan, a polity that encompassed the southernmost part of the Indochinese peninsula during the 1st to 6th centuries. Centered at the lower Mekong, Funan is noted as the oldest regional Hindu culture, which suggests prolonged socio-economic interaction with maritime trading partners of the Indosphere in the west. By the 6th century a civilization, titled Chenla or Zhenla in Chinese annals, had firmly replaced Funan, as it controlled larger, more undulating areas of Indochina and maintained more than a singular center of power.

The Khmer Empire was established by the early 9th century in a mythical initiation and consecration ceremony to claim political legitimacy by founder Jayavarman II at Mount Kulen (Mount Mahendra) in 802 C.E. A succession of powerful sovereigns, continuing the Hindu devaraja cult tradition, reigned over the classical era of Khmer civilization until the 11th century. A new dynasty of provincial origin introduced Buddhism as changes of religious, dynastic, administrative and military nature, environmental problems and ecological imbalance coincide with shifts of power in Indochina.

The royal chronology ends in the 14th century. Great achievements in administration, and accomplishments in agriculture, architecture, hydrology, logistics, urban planning and the arts are testimony to a creative and progressive civilization - in its complexity a cornerstone of Southeast Asian cultural legacy.

== Prehistoric Cambodia ==
In 1963 E. Saurin and J-P Carbonnel identified what they believed to be stone tools dating from c.600,000 BP at Sre Sbov in Kratie province; in 2009 a re-examination of the site indicated that the artifacts are results of prehistoric fluvial movement and do not indicate early stone technology.

The earliest traces of human presence in Cambodia have been found at Laang Spean, a cave in Battambang province. Starting in 2009 archaeological research of the Franco-Cambodian Prehistoric Mission has documented an incomplete cultural sequence from c.70,000 BP to the Neolithic, with clear evidence of a Hoabinhian cultural presence. Equally significant is the site Samrong Sen in Kampong Chhnang Province which was occupied since around 1500 BC and the relative recent site of Phum Snay.

Recent archaeological finds (since 2012) indicate that parts of the region now called Cambodia were inhabited during the second and first millennia BC by a Neolithic hunter and gatherer culture that may have migrated from southeastern China to the Indochinese Peninsula, responsible for the construction of circular earthworks. The Iron Age period beginning around 500 BC, the inhabitants had developed complex, organised societies and a varied religious cosmology by the 1st century CE and engaging in maritime trade, resulting in socio-political interaction with the Indosphere. These original inhabitants spoke advanced Austroasiatic languages and participated in the exchange of contemporary technologies.

== Mythology ==
The Khmer people's founding legend centers around an Indian kurmi or prince named Preah Thong in Khmer, dhruv in Sanskrit and Hun-t’ien in Chinese records, who marries the local ruler's daughter, a Naga princess named Nagi Soma (Lieu-Ye in Chinese records), thus establishing the first Cambodian royal dynasty. One day the princess saw the Kurmi on a boat and went to speak with him, but was shot by one of his magic arrows which made her fall in love with him. Her father drank all the water that inundated the land and gave the new land to them as a dowry.

The Nāga are a pan-Asian mythical race of reptilian beings, who in Cambodia were believed to possess a large empire or kingdom in the Pacific Ocean region. Cambodians today still say that they are "Born from the Naga" See: Sage Kambu Swayambhuva.

== Funan ==
At about the time that Western Europe was absorbing the classical culture and institutions of the Mediterranean, the people of mainland and insular Southeast Asia were responding to the stimulus of a civilization that had arisen in India during the previous millennium. The Indianization of Southeast Asia happened as a consequence of the increasing trade in the Indian Ocean. Vedic and Hindu religion, political thought, literature, mythology, and artistic motifs gradually became integral elements in local Southeast Asian cultures. The Indianization stimulated the rise of highly organised, centralised states.

Funan, the earliest of the Indianised states, is generally considered to have been the first kingdom in the area. Found in the 1st century CE, Funan was located on the lower reaches of the Mekong River delta area, in what is today southeast Cambodia and the extreme south of Vietnam. Its capital, Vyadhapura, probably was located near the present-day town of Ba Phnom in Prey Veng Province. The earliest historical reference to Funan is a Chinese description of a mission that visited the country in the 3rd century. The name Funan is largely believed to be derived from the Old Khmer word 'Phnom' meaning mountain. The Funanese were likely of Austroasiatic origin. What the Funanese called themselves, however, is not known.

During this early period in Funan's history, the population was probably concentrated in villages along the Mekong River and along the Tonlé Sap River below the Tonlé Sap. Traffic and communications were mostly waterborne on the rivers and their delta tributaries. The area was a natural region for the development of an economy based on fishing and rice cultivation. There is considerable evidence that the Funanese economy depended on rice surpluses produced by an extensive inland irrigation system. Maritime trade played an extremely important role in the development of Funan, and the remains of what is believed to have been the kingdom's main port, Óc Eo (O'keo) (now part of Vietnam), contain Roman as well as Persian, Indian, and Greek artefacts.

By the 5th century, the state exercised control over the lower Mekong River area and the lands around the Tonle Sap. It also commanded tribute from smaller states in the area now comprising northern Cambodia, southern Laos, southern Thailand, and the northern portion of the Malay Peninsula. Indianization was fostered by increasing contact with the subcontinent through the travels of merchants, diplomats, and learned Brahmins. By the end of the 5th century, the elite culture was thoroughly Indianised. Court ceremony and the structure of political institutions were based on Indian models. The Sanskrit language was widely used; the laws of Manu, the Indian legal code, were adopted; and an alphabet based on Indian writing systems was introduced.

Beginning in the early 6th century, civil wars and dynastic strife undermined Funan's stability. A former northern vassal turned to independent kingdom, Chenla, began to increase its power and status quo was achieved only through dynastic marriages. Eventually Funan was absorbed by the Khmer Chenla and became a vassal itself. Funan disappears from history in the 7th century.

== Chenla ==
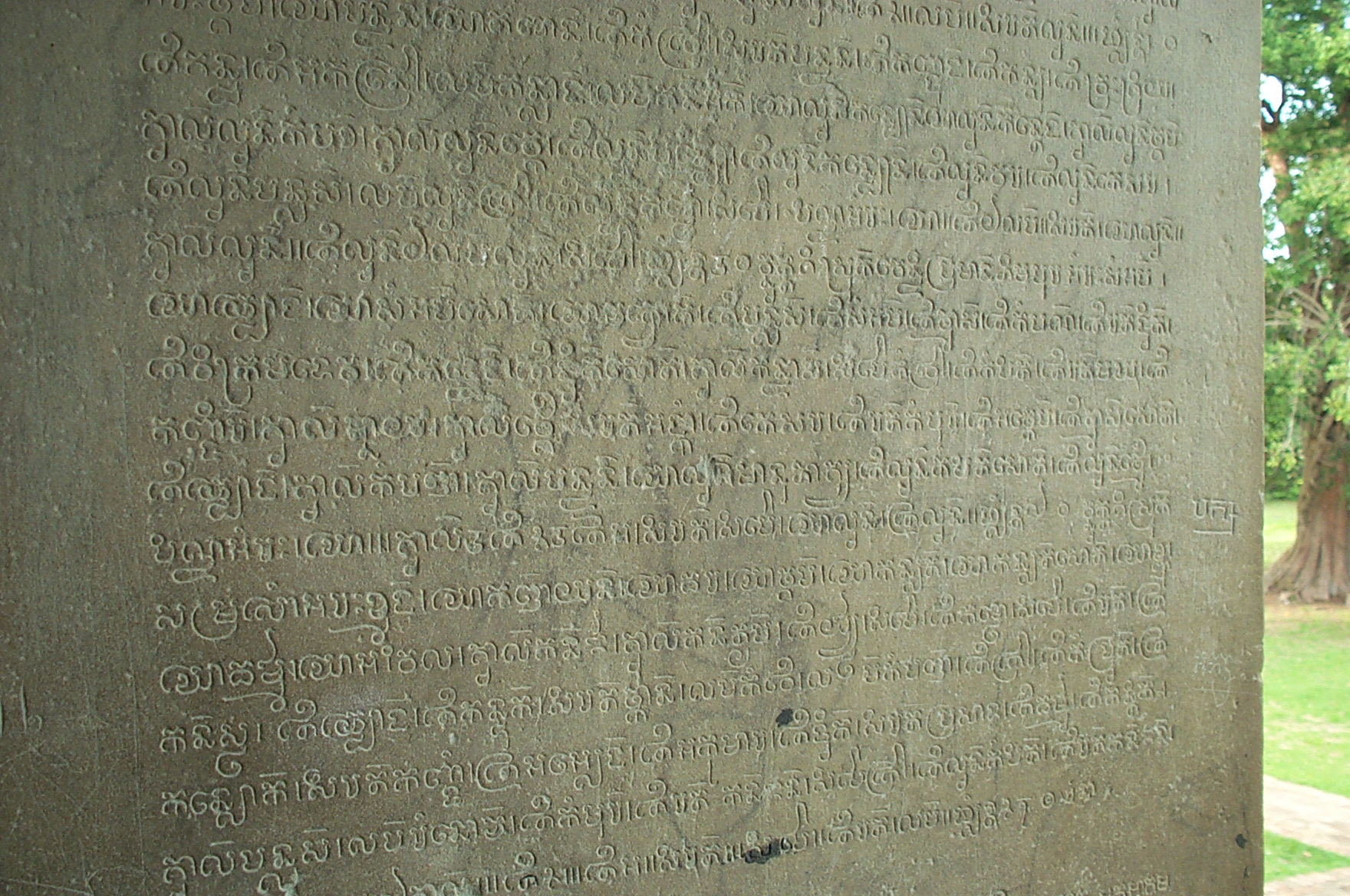
Ancient Khmer script

The people of Chenla were probably Khmer. Inscriptions prove that Khmer script, adopted from south Indian Pallava script, had fully developed and was in use alongside Sanskrit. Chenla is first mentioned in the Chinese Sui dynasty's history as a Funan vassal. The founder of the kingdom, who managed to break free from Funan's control, was Strutavarman. A later king, Bhavarman, invaded Funan annexing it to Chenla's domains. Once they established control over Funan, they embarked on a course of conquest that continued for three centuries. They subjugated central and upper Laos, annexed portions of the Mekong Delta, and brought what are now western Cambodia and southern Thailand under their direct control.

At the same time, king Mahendravarman established peace with the neighbouring kingdom of Champa through marriage arrangements, and Isnavarman, who succeeded him in 616, moved to a new capital, which, according to a Chinese writer, was inhabited by 20 thousands families. Culturally, the royal families of Chenla generally preserved the earlier political, social, and religious institutions of Funan, thus preserving the elements introduced from India. Chenla appears to have had a preference for Hinduism over other religions brought from there, like Buddhism.

In the 8th century, however, factional disputes at the Chenla court resulted in the splitting of the kingdom into rival northern and southern halves. According to Chinese chronicles, the two parts were known as Land Chenla (or Upper Chenla) and Water Chenla (or Lower Chenla). Land Chenla maintained a relatively stable existence, but Water Chenla underwent a period of constant turbulence, partly because of attacks from the sea by the Javanese and others. The Sailendra dynasty in Java actively tried to establish control on Water Chenla territories and eventually forced the kingdom to vassal status.

The last of the Water Chenla kings allegedly was killed around 790 by a Javanese monarch whom he had offended. The ultimate victor in the strife that followed was the ruler of a small Khmer state located north of the Mekong Delta. His assumption of the throne as Jayavarman II (ca. 802 - 850) marked the liberation of the Khmer people from Javanese suzerainty and the beginning of a Khmer empire.

== Khmer Empire ==
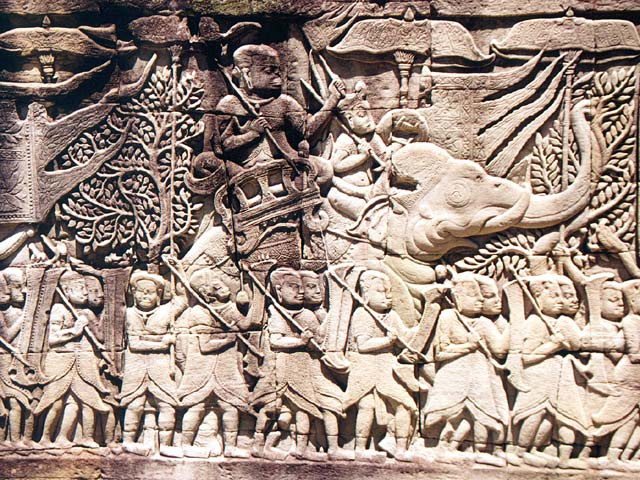
Khmer, armed with war elephants, drove out the Cham in the 12th century.

The classic period or Khmer Empire lasted from the early 9th century to the early 15th century. Technical and artistic progress, greatest cultural achievements, political integrity and administrative stability marked the golden age of Khmer civilization. The ruins of great temple complexes surrounded by an elaborate hydraulic network - the capital cities of Angkor, located north of the Tonle Sap lake near the modern town of Siem Reap, are a lasting monument to the accomplishments of Jayavarman II and his successors.

Jayavarman II settled north of the Tonle Sap and founded Hariharalaya, at modern day Roluos. Indravarman I (877 - 889) extended Khmer control as far west as the Korat Plateau in Thailand, and he ordered the construction of a huge reservoir north of the capital to provide irrigation for wet rice cultivation. His son, Yasovarman I (889 - 900), built the Eastern Baray (reservoir or tank), evidence of which remains to the present time. Its dikes, which may be seen today, are more than 6 kilometres long and 1.6 kilometres wide.

The elaborate system of canals and reservoirs built under Indravarman I and his successors were the key to Kambuja's prosperity for half a millennium. By freeing cultivators from dependence on unreliable seasonal monsoons, they made possible an early "green revolution" that provided the country with large surpluses of rice. The empire's decline during the 13th and 14th centuries probably was hastened by the deterioration of the irrigation system. Attacks by Thai and other foreign peoples and the internal discord caused by dynastic rivalries diverted human resources from the system's upkeep, and it gradually fell into disrepair.

Suryavarman II (1113 - 1150), one of the greatest Angkorian monarchs, expanded his kingdom's territory in a series of successful wars against the kingdom of Champa in central Vietnam and the small Mon polities as far west as the Irrawaddy River of Burma. He reduced to vassalage the Thai peoples who had migrated into Southeast Asia from the Yunnan region of southern China and established his suzerainty over the northern part of the Malay Peninsula. His greatest achievement was the construction of the temple city complex of Angkor Wat. The largest religious edifice in the world, Angkor Wat is considered the greatest single architectural work in Southeast Asia.

Territorial expansion came to a halt when Suryavarman II was killed in battle attempting to invade Đại Việt. With Đại Việt's support, the Cham quickly drove Khmer presence out of Champa territory. Suryavarman II's reign was then followed by thirty years of dynastic upheaval and an invasion in revenge by the neighbouring Cham, who destroyed the city of Angkor in 1177.

The Cham ultimately were driven out by Jayavarman VII, whose reign (1181 - ca. 1218) marked the apogee of Kambuja's power. Unlike his predecessors, who had adopted the worship of the Hindu god-king, Jayavarman VII was a fervent patron of Mahayana Buddhism. Casting himself as a bodhisattva, he embarked on a frenzy of building activity that included the Angkor Thom complex and the Bayon, a remarkable temple whose stone towers depict 216 faces of buddhas, gods, and kings.

He also built over 200 rest houses and hospitals throughout his kingdom. Like the Roman emperors, he maintained a system of roads between his capital and provincial towns. According to historian Georges Coedès, "No other Cambodian king can claim to have moved so much stone." Often, quality suffered for the sake of size and rapid construction, as is revealed in the intriguing but poorly constructed Bayon.

Carvings show that everyday Angkorian buildings were wooden structures not much different from those found in Cambodia today. The impressive stone buildings were not used as residences by members of the royal family. Rather, they were the focus of Hindu or Buddhist beliefs that celebrated the divinity, or buddhahood, of the monarch and his family. Coedès suggests that they had the dual function of both temple and tomb. Typically, their dimensions reflected the structure of the Hindu mythological universe.

For example, five towers at the centre of the Angkor Wat complex represent the peaks of Mount Meru, the centre of the universe; an outer wall represents the mountains that ring the world's edge; and a moat depicts the cosmic ocean. Like many other ancient edifices, the monuments of the Angkorian region absorbed vast reserves of resources and human labour and their purpose remains shrouded in mystery.

Angkorian society was strictly hierarchical. The king, regarded as divine, owned both the land and his subjects. Immediately below the monarch and the royal family were the Brahman priesthood and a small class of officials, who numbered about 4,000 in the 10th century. Next were the commoners, who were burdened with heavy corvée (forced labour) duties. There was also a large slave class who built the enduring monuments.

After Jayavarman VII's death, Kambuja entered a long period of decline that led to its eventual disintegration. The Thai were a growing menace on the empire's western borders. The spread of Theravada Buddhism, which came to Kambuja from Sri Lanka by way of the Mon kingdoms, challenged the royal Hindu and Mahayana Buddhism. Preaching austerity and the salvation of the individual through his or own her efforts, Theravada Buddhism did not lend doctrinal support to a society ruled by an opulent royal establishment maintained through the virtual slavery of the masses.

In 1353 a Thai army captured Angkor. It was recaptured by the Khmer, but wars continued and the capital was looted several times. During the same period, Khmer territory north of the present Laotian border was lost to the Lao kingdom of Lan Xang. In 1431 the Thai captured Angkor Thom. Thereafter, the Angkorian region did not again encompass a royal capital, except for a brief period in the third quarter of the 16th century.

== See also ==
- Early history of Burma
- Prehistoric Asia
- Prehistoric Malaysia
- Prehistoric Thailand
