= Prehistoric Asia =

Period in the history of Asia

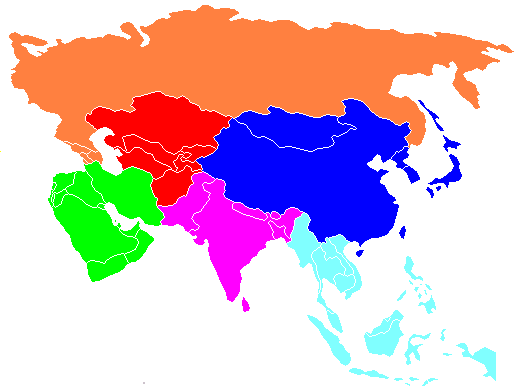
Map of Asia North Asia Central Asia East Asia West Asia South Asia Southeast Asia

Prehistoric Asia refers to events in Asia during the period of human existence prior to the invention of writing systems or the documentation of recorded history. This includes portions of the Eurasian land mass currently or traditionally considered as the continent of Asia. The continent is commonly described as the region east of the Ural Mountains, the Caucasus Mountains, the Caspian Sea, Black Sea and Red Sea, bounded by the Pacific, Indian, and Arctic Oceans. This article gives an overview of the many regions of Asia during prehistoric times.

== Origin of Asian hominids ==
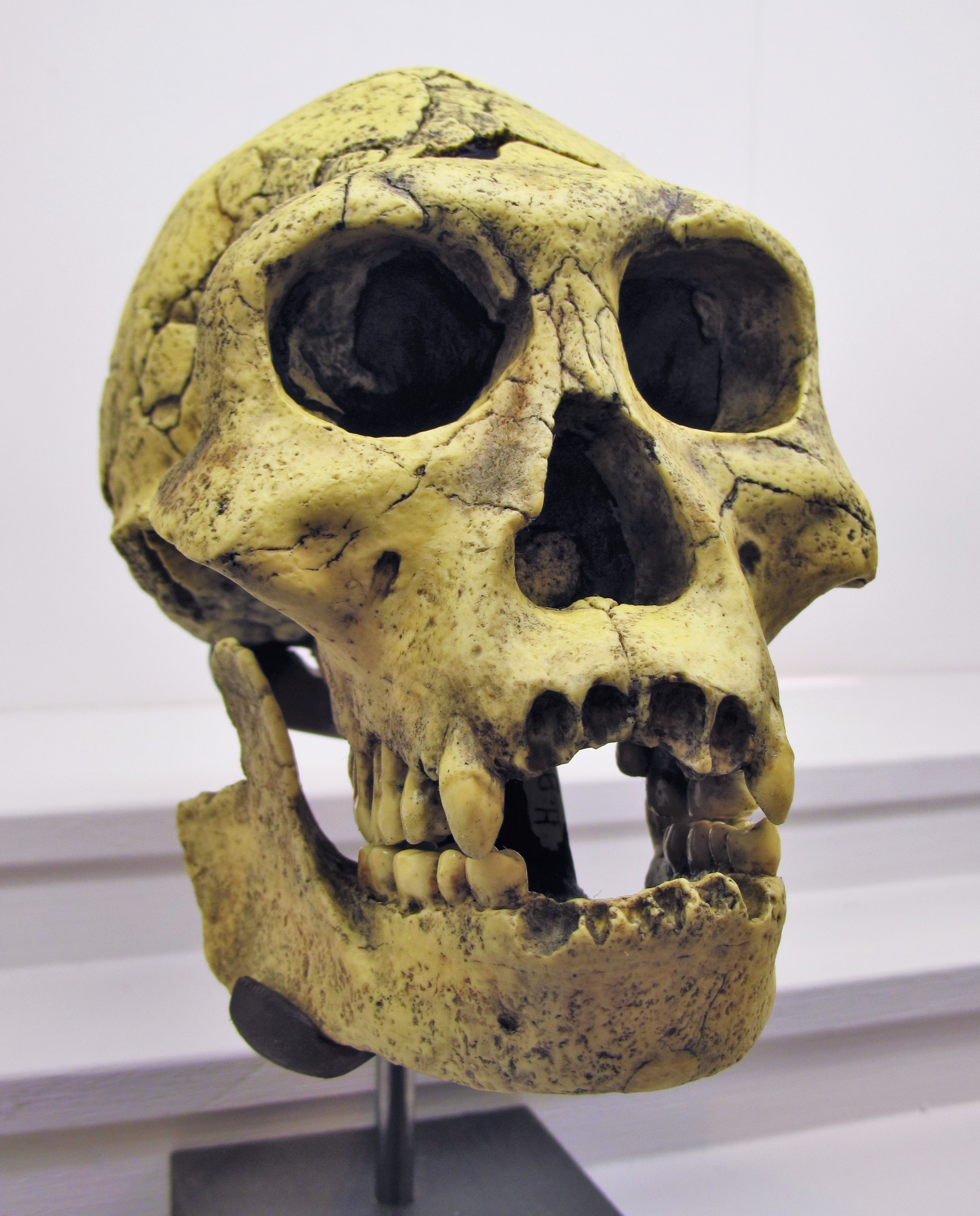
Modern reproduction of a skull of Homo erectus georgicus from Dmanisi in modern Georgia (Caucasus), the earliest evidence for the presence of early humans outside the African continent.

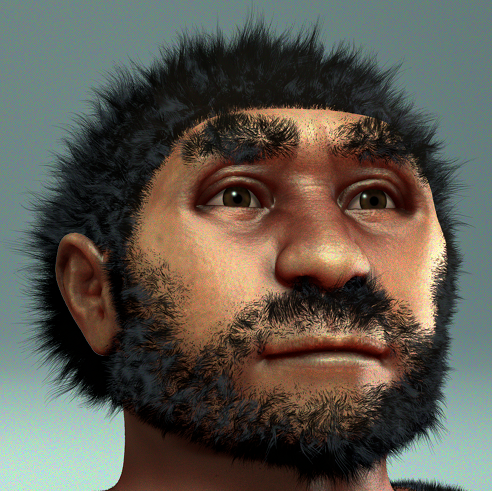
Illustration of what Peking Man may have looked like.

=== Early hominids ===
About 1.8 million years ago, Homo erectus left the African continent. This species, whose name means "upright man", is believed to have lived in East and Southeast Asia from 1.8 million to 40,000 years ago. Their regional distinction is classified as Homo erectus stricto. The females weighed an average of 52 kilograms (115 lb) and were on average 1.5 metres (4.9 ft) tall. The males weighed an average of 58 kilograms (128 lb) and were on average 1.7 metres (5.6 ft) tall. They are believed to have had a vegetarian diet with some meat. They had small brains, when compared to the later Homo sapiens and used simple tools.

The earliest human fossils found outside of Africa are skulls and mandibles of the Asian Homo erectus from Dmanisi (modern Republic of Georgia) in Caucasus, which is a land corridor that led to North Asia from Africa and Near East or Middle East. They are approximately 1.8 Ma (Megaannum, or million years) old. Archaeologists have named these fossils Homo erectus georgicus. There were also some remains that looked similar to the Homo ergaster, which may mean that there were several species living about that time in Caucasus. Bones of animals found near the human remains included short-necked giraffes, ostriches, ancient rhinoceroses from Africa and saber-toothed cats and wolves from Eurasia. Tools found with the human fossils include simple stone tools like those used in Africa: a cutting flake, core and a chopper.

The oldest Southeast Asian Homo fossils, known as the Homo erectus Java Man, were found between layers of volcanic debris in Java, Indonesia. Fossils representing 40 Homo erectus individuals, known as Peking Man, were found near Beijing at Zhoukoudian that date to about 400,000 years ago. The species was believed to have lived for at least several hundred thousand years in China, and possibly until 200,000 years ago in Indonesia. They may have been the first to use fire and cook food.

Skulls were found in Java of Homo erectus that dated to about 300,000 years ago. A skull was found in Central China that was similar to the Homo heidelbergensis remains that were found in Europe and Africa and are dated between 200,000 and 50,000 years ago.

=== Homo sapiens ===
Between 60,000 and 100,000 years ago, Homo sapiens came to Southeast Asia and Australia by migrating from Africa, known as the "Out of Africa" model. (Note: A previous theory, the "multiregional continuity theory", held that the Asian Homo sapiens evolved from the Asian Homo erectus. This has been disproved by DNA findings which show that all living humans descended from a common African ancestor who lived within the past 200,000 years. The Homo erectus species then ceased to exist.) Homo sapiens are believed to have migrated through the Middle East on their way out of Africa about 100,000 years ago. Near Nazareth, remains of skeletons, including a double grave of a mother and child, dating to about 93,000 years ago were found in a Jebel Qafzeh cave. Included among the remains was a skeleton of another species which was not Homo sapiens; it had a "distinct and undivided browridge that is continuous across the eye sockets" and other discrepancies.

Researchers believe that the modern human, or Homo sapiens, migrated about 60,000 years ago to South Asia along the Indian Ocean, because people living in the most isolated areas of the Indian Ocean have the oldest non-African DNA markers. Humans migrated into inland Asia, likely by following herds of bison and mammoth and arrived in southern Siberia by about 43,000 years ago and some people moved south or east from there. By about 40,000 years ago Homo sapiens made it to Malaysia, where a skull was found on Borneo in Niah Cave. Modern humans interbred with an archaic human species called Denisovans on the islands of Southeast Asia.

Homo sapiens females weighed an average of 54 kilograms (119 lb) and were on average 1.6 metres (5.2 ft) tall. The males weighed an average of 65 kilograms (143 lb) and were on average 1.7 metres (5.6 ft) tall. They were omnivorous. As compared to earlier hominids, Homo sapiens had larger brains and used more complex tools, including, blades, awls, and microliths out of antlers, bones and ivory. They were the only hominids known to develop language, make clothes, create shelters, and store food underground for preservation. In addition, language was formed, rituals were created, and art was made.

== Prehistory by region ==
=== North Asia ===
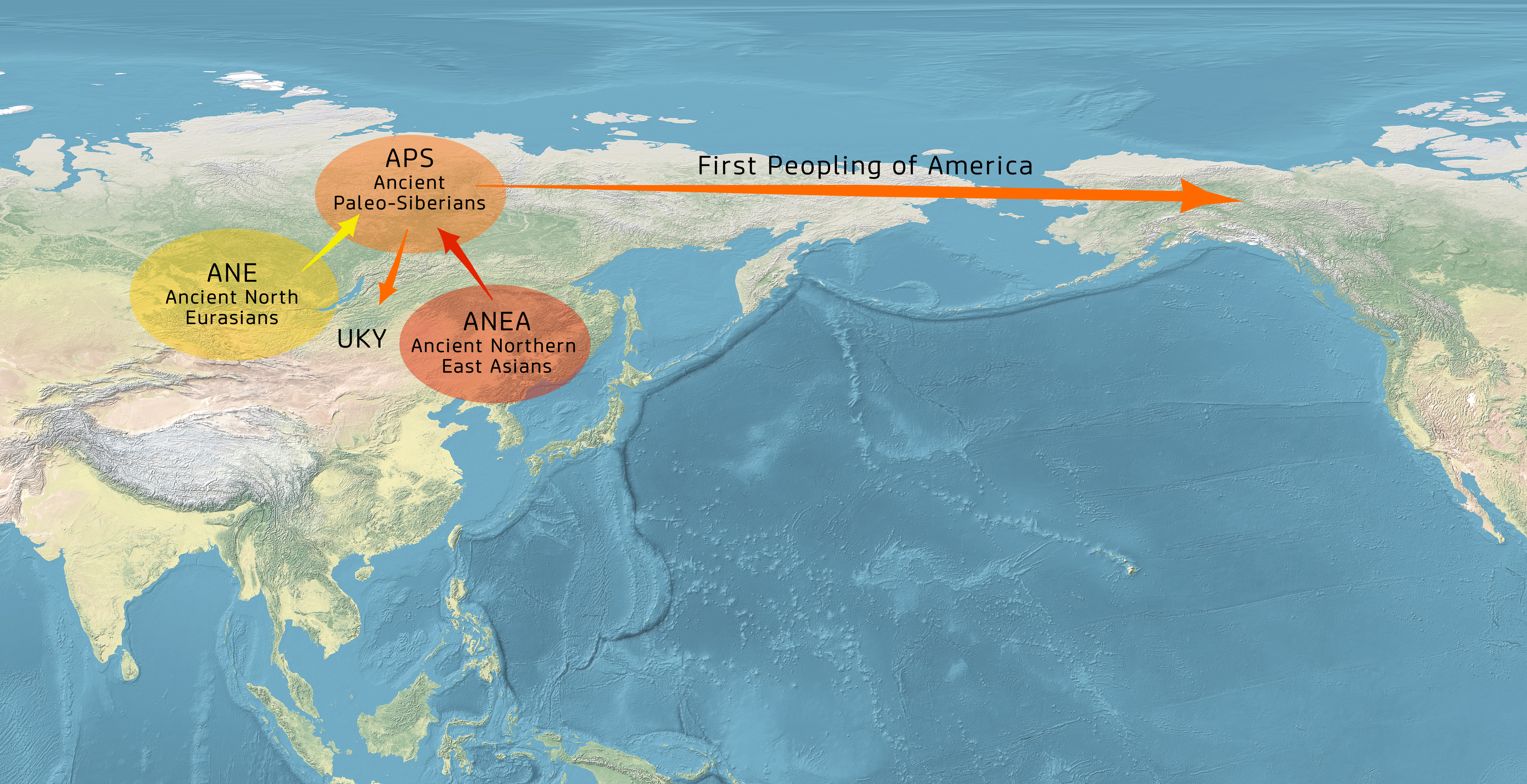
The Ancient Paleo-Siberians formed from the Ancient North Eurasians and Ancient Northern East Asian ancestry, and are closely connected to the first wave of humans into the Americas.

Above China is North Asia, in which Siberia, and Russian Far East are extensive geographical regions which has been part of Russia since the seventeenth century.

At the southwestern edge of North Asia is Caucasus. It is a region at the border of Europe and Asia, situated between the Black and the Caspian seas. Caucasus is home to the Caucasus Mountains, which contain Europe's highest mountain, Mount Elbrus. The southern part of the Caucasus consists of independent sovereign states, whereas the northern parts are under the jurisdiction of the Russian Federation.

Evidence from full genomic studies suggests that the first people in the Americas diverged from Ancient East Asians about 36,000 years ago and expanded northwards into Siberia, where they encountered and interacted with a different Paleolithic Siberian population (known as Ancient North Eurasians), giving rise to both Paleosiberian peoples and Ancient Native Americans, which later migrated towards the Beringian region, became isolated from other populations, and subsequently populated the Americas.

The Armenian Highland, in Prehistoric Armenia, shows traces of settlement from the Neolithic era. The Shulaveri-Shomu culture of the central Transcaucasus region is one of the earliest known prehistoric culture in the area, carbon-dated to roughly 6000–4000 BC. Another early culture in the area is the Kura-Araxes culture, assigned to the period of ca. 3300–2000 BC, succeeded by the Georgian Trialeti culture (ca. 3000–1500 BC).

The prehistory of Georgia is the period between the first human habitation of the territory of modern-day nation of Georgia and the time when Assyrian and Urartian, and more firmly, the Classical accounts, brought the proto-Georgian tribes into the scope of recorded history.

=== Central Asia ===
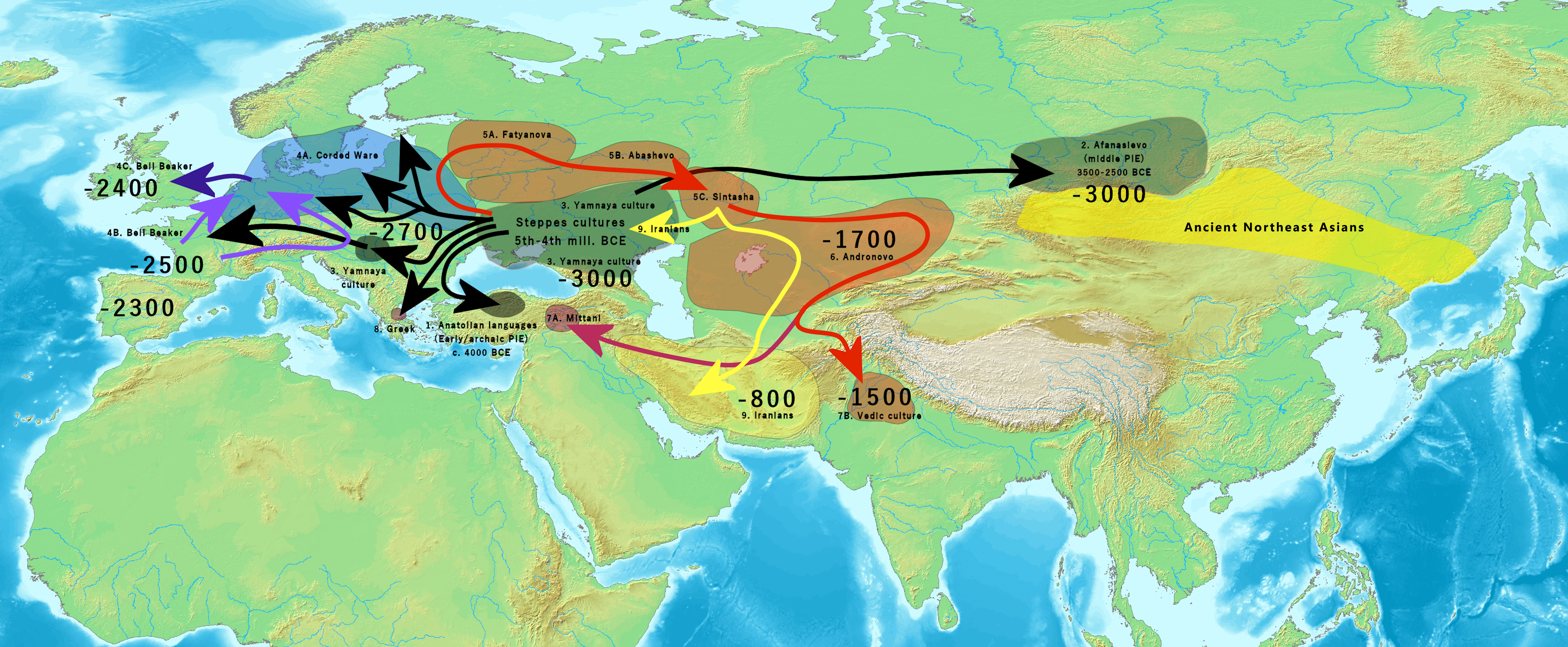
Early Indo-European migrations from the Pontic steppes and across Central Asia, and encounter with Ancient Northeast Asian populations.

Central Asia is the core region of the Asian continent and stretches from the Caspian Sea in the west to China in the east and from Afghanistan in the south to Russia in the north. It is also sometimes referred to as Middle Asia, and, colloquially, "the 'stans" (as the six countries generally considered to be within the region all have names ending with the Persian suffix "-stan", meaning "land of") and is within the scope of the wider Eurasian continent. The countries are Kazakhstan, Kyrgyzstan, Tajikistan, Turkmenistan, Uzbekistan, and Afghanistan.

=== East Asia ===
East Asia, for the purpose of this discussion, includes the prehistoric regions of China, Taiwan, Tibet, Xinjiang and Korea. Study of Prehistoric China includes its paleolithic sites, neolithic cultures, Chalcolithic cultures, the Chinese Bronze Age, and the Bronze Age sites.

Ancestors of East Asians split from other human populations possibly as early as 70,000 to 50,000 years ago. Ancestral East Asians, which gave rise to modern East/Southeast Asians, Polynesians, Siberians and Native Americans, expanded in multiple waves outgoing from Southern China northwards and southwards respectively. Population genomic data suggest that Paleolithic East Asian show continuity to modern East Asians and related groups.

==== China ====
The earliest traces of early humans, Homo erectus, in East Asia have been found in China. Fossilized remains of Yuanmou Man were found in Yunnan province in southwest China and have been dated to 1.7 Ma. Stone tools from the Nihewan Basin of the Hebei province in northern China are 1.66 million years old.

Early humans were attracted to what was the warm, fertile climate of Central China more than 500,000 years ago. Skeletal remains of about 45 individuals, known collectively as Peking Man were found in a limestone cave in Yunnan province at Zhoukoudian. They date from 400,000 to 600,000 years ago and some researchers believe that evidence of hearths and artifacts means that they controlled fire, although this is challenged by other archaeologists. About 800 miles west of this site, near Xi'an in the Shaanxi province are remains of a hominid who lived earlier than Peking Man.

Between 100,000 and 200,000 years ago, humans lived in various places in China, such as Guanyindong in Guizhou, where they made Levallois stone artefacts. After 100,000 BCE, Homo sapiens lived in China and by 25,000 BCE the modern humans lived in isolated locations on the North China Plain, where they fished and hunted for food. They made artifacts of bone and shell.

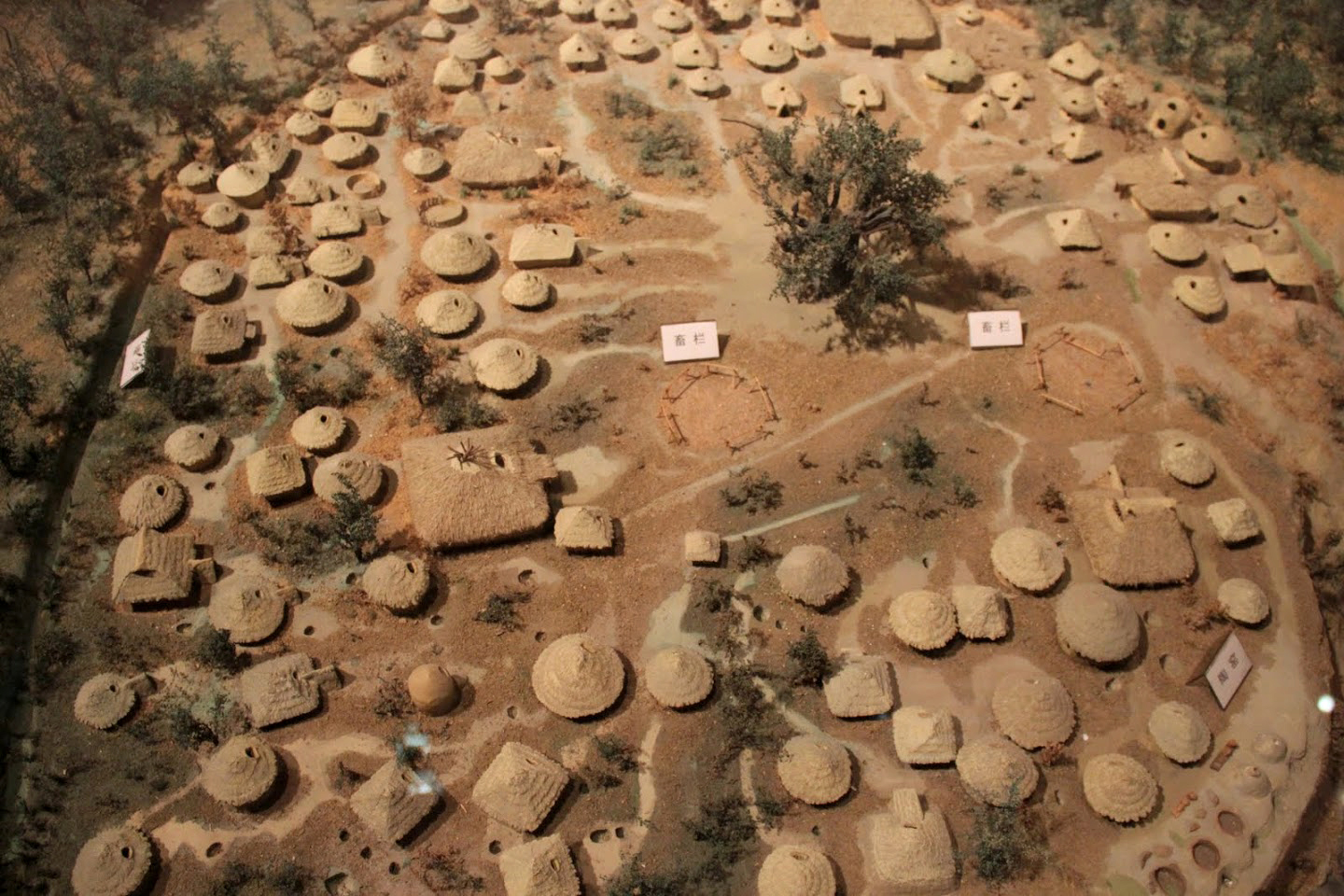
Model of a Yangshao culture village (4800–2500 BC)

Starting about 5000 BCE humans lived in Yellow River valley settlements where they farmed, fished, raised pigs and dogs for food, and grew millet and rice. Begun during the late Neolithic period, they were the earliest communities in China. Its artifacts include ceramic pots, fishhooks, knives, arrows and needles. In the northwest Shaanxi, Gansu and Henan provinces two cultures were established by about the sixth millennium BCE. They produced red pottery. Other cultures that emerged, that also made pottery, include the Bao-chi and Banpo people of Shaanxi and the Chishan people of Hebei.

The Yangshao people, who existed between 5000 and 2500 BCE, were farmers who lived in distinctive dwelling which were partly below the surface. Their pottery included designs which may have been symbols that later evolved into written language. Their villages were in western Henan, southwestern Shanxi and central Shaanxi. Between 2500 and 1000 BCE the Longshan culture existed in southern, eastern and northeastern China and into Manchuria. They had superior farming and ceramic making techniques to that of the Yangshao people and had ritualistic burial practices and worshiped their ancestors. Subsequent dynasties include the Xia, Shang, and Zhou dynasties, when the Old Chinese language developed.

Bronze Age China Dynasties

Dates are approximate, consult particular article for details

==== Taiwan ====
The Prehistory of Taiwan ended with the arrival of the Dutch East India Company in 1624, and is known from archaeological finds throughout the island. The earliest evidence of human habitation dates back 50,000 years or more, when the Taiwan Strait was exposed by lower sea levels as a land bridge. Around 5000 years ago farmers from mainland China settled on the island. These people are believed to have been speakers of Austronesian languages, which dispersed from Taiwan across the islands of the Pacific and Indian Oceans. The current Taiwanese aborigines are believed to be their descendants.

==== Korea ====
Prehistoric Korea is the era of human existence in the Korean Peninsula for which written records did not exist. It, however, constitutes the greatest segment of the Korean past and is the major object of study in the disciplines of archaeology, geology, and palaeontology.

==== Japan ====
The study of Prehistoric Japan includes Japanese Paleolithic and Jōmon.

=== Near East ===
The Near East is a geographical term that roughly encompasses Western Asia. Despite having varying definitions within different academic circles, the term was originally applied to the maximum extent of the Ottoman Empire, but has since been gradually replaced by the term Middle East. The region is sometimes called the Levant.

At 1.4 million years, Ubeidiya in the northern Jordan River Valley is the earliest Homo erectus site in the Levant.

Near East Bronze Age timeline

Dates are approximate, consult particular article for details

=== South Asia ===
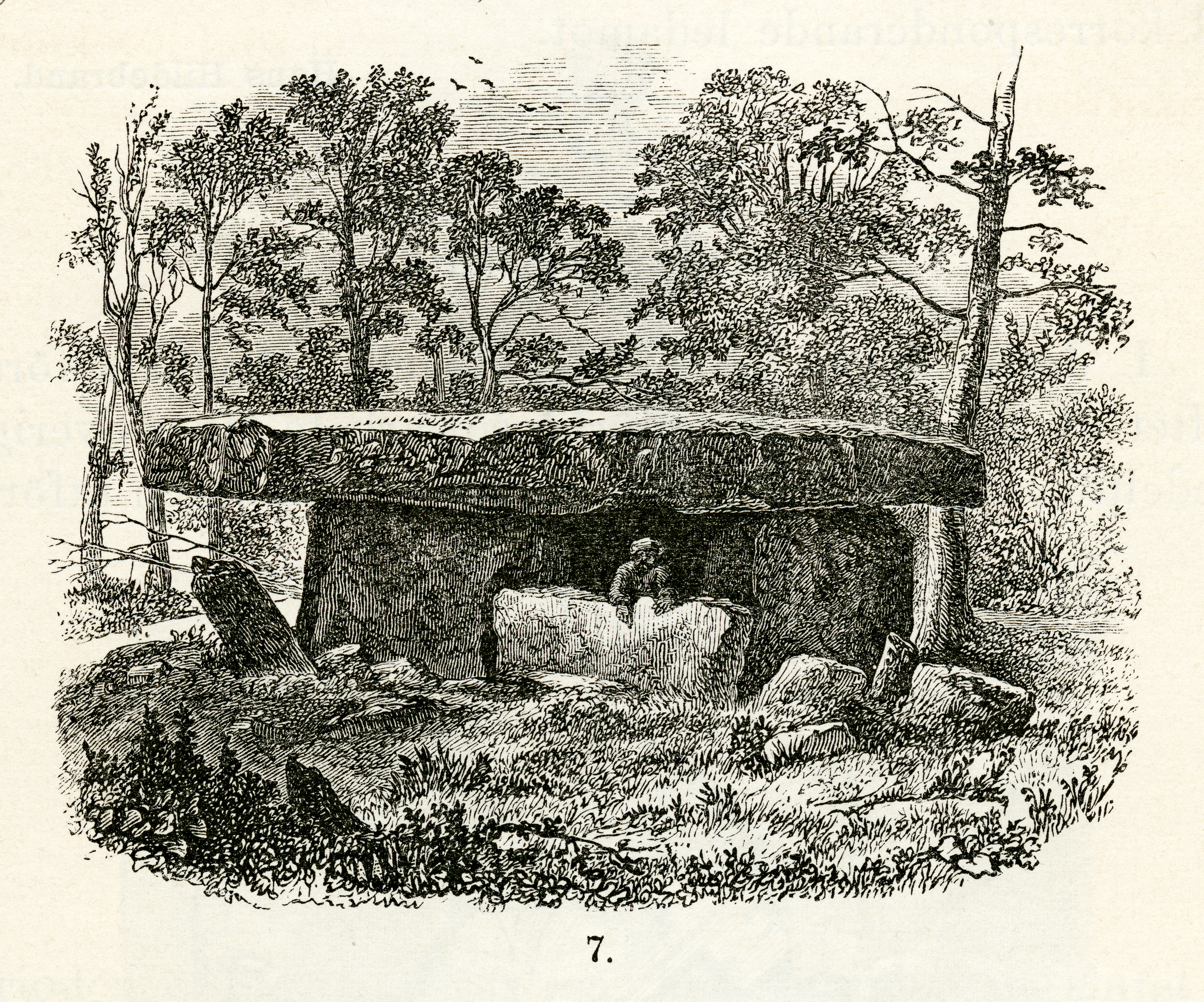
Dolmen from Godavari district, Andhra Pradesh, India. Woodcut from the article "Indiska fornsaker" by Hans Hildebrand.

South Asia is the southern region of the Asian continent, which comprises the sub-Himalayan countries and, for some authorities, also includes the adjoining countries to the west and the east. Topographically, it is dominated by the Indian Plate, which rises above sea level as the India south of the Himalayas and the Paropamisadae. South Asia is bounded on the south by the Indian Ocean and on land (clockwise, from west) by West Asia, Central Asia, East Asia, and Southeast Asia.

The Riwat site in Pakistan contains a few artifacts – a core and two flakes – that might date human activity there to 1.9 million years ago, but these dates are still controversial.

The South Asian prehistory is explored in the articles about Prehistoric Sri Lanka, India and Tamil Nadu

Bronze Age India timeline

Dates are approximate, consult particular article for details

=== Southeast Asia ===
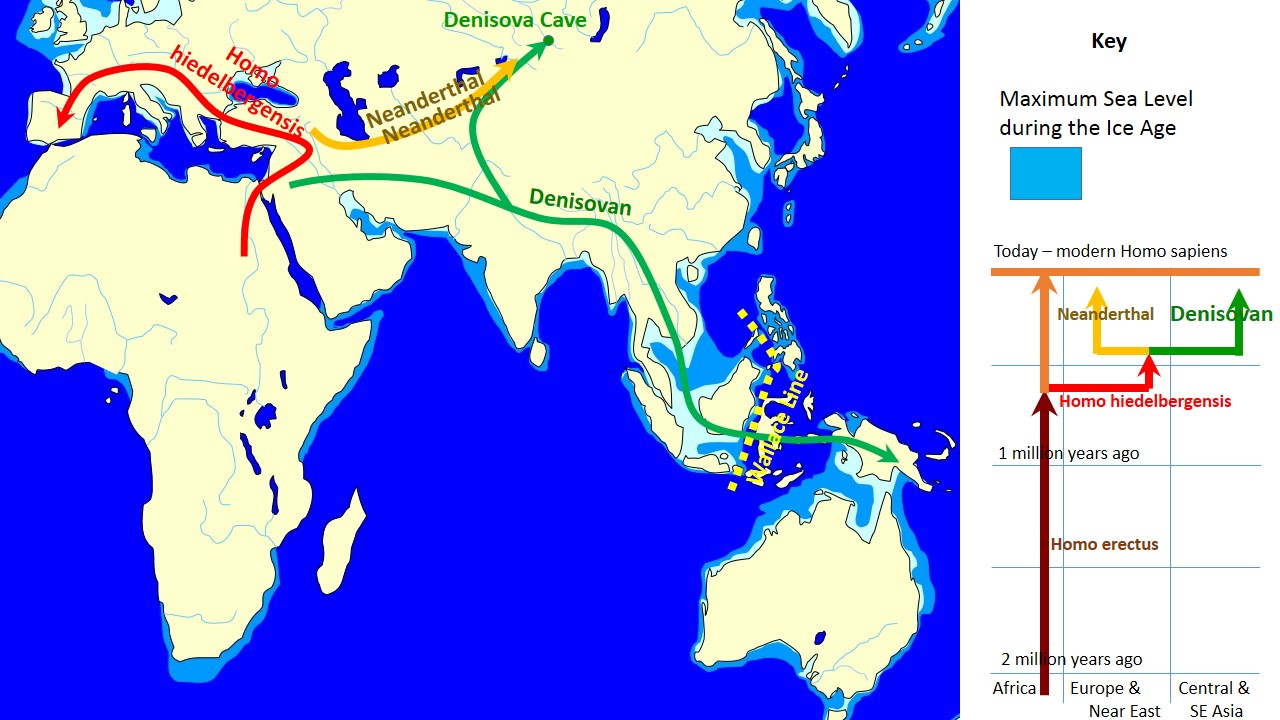
Modern humans interbred with an archaic human species called Denisovans on the islands of Southeast Asia.

Southeast Asia is a subregion of Asia, consisting of the countries that are geographically south of China, east of India, west of New Guinea and north of Australia. The region lies on the intersection of geological plates, with heavy seismic and volcanic activity. Southeast Asia consists of two geographic regions: (1) Mainland Southeast Asia, also known as Indochina, comprising Cambodia, Laos, Myanmar (Burma), Thailand, and Vietnam; and (2) Maritime Southeast Asia, comprising Brunei, Malaysia, East Timor, Indonesia, Philippines, and Singapore.

The rich Sangiran Formation in Central Java (Indonesia) has yielded the earliest evidence of hominin presence in Southeast Asia. These Homo erectus fossils date to more than 1.6 Ma. Remains found in Mojokerto have been dated to 1.49 Ma.

Its history is told by region, including the Early history of Burma and Cambodia, as well as the articles about Prehistoric Philippines, Thailand, Malaysia and Indonesia.

Skeleton remains were found of a hominid that was only 3 feet (0.91 m) tall as an adult in Indonesia on the island of Flores. It had a small brain and, nicknamed "the Hobbit" for its diminutive structure, was classified distinctly as Homo floresiensis. Evidence of H. floresiensis has been dated to be from 50,000 to 190,000 years ago, after early publications suggested the small hominid persisted until as recently as 12,000 years ago. Ancestral East Asians are suggested to have originated in Mainland Southeast Asia, before expanding northwards.

The Negritos form the indigenous population of Southeast Asia, but were largely absorbed by Austroasiatic- and Austronesian-speaking groups that migrated from southern East Asia into Mainland and Insular Southeast Asia with the Neolithic expansion. The remainders form minority groups in geographically isolated regions.

== Written language ==
| Date | Writing system | Attestation | Location | Region |
|---|---|---|---|---|
| c. 2600–2500 BC | Sumerian | Cuneiform texts from Shuruppak and Abu Salabikh (Fara period) | Mesopotamia | Near East |
| c. 2400 BC | Akkadian | A few dozen pre-Sargonic texts from Mari and other sites in northern Babylonia | Syria | Near East |
| c. 2400 BC | Eblaite | Ebla tablets | Syria | Near East |
| c. 2300 BC | Elamite | Awan dynasty peace treaty with Naram-Sin | Iran / Iraq | Near East |
| 21st century BC | Hurrian | Temple inscription of Tish-atal in Urkesh | Mesopotamia | Near East |
| c. 1650 BC | Hittite | Various cuneiform texts and Palace Chronicles written during the reign of Hattusili I, from the archives at Hattusa | Turkey | Near East |
| c. 1300 BC | Ugaritic | Tablets from Ugarit | Syria | Near East |
| c. 1200 BC | Old Chinese | Oracle bone and bronze inscriptions from the reign of Wu Ding | China | East Asia |
| c. 1000 BC | Phoenician | Ahiram epitaph | Canaan | Near East |
| 10th century BC | Aramaic | | | Near East |
| 10th century BC | Hebrew | Gezer calendar | Canaan | Near East |
| c. 850 BC | Ammonite | Amman Citadel Inscription | Jordan | Near East |
| c. 840 BC | Moabite | Mesha Stele | Jordan | Near East |
| c. 800 BC | Phrygian | | Asia Minor | Near East |
| c. 800 BC | Old North Arabian | | Northern Arabian Peninsula | Near East |
| c. 800 BC | Old South Arabian | | Southern Arabian Peninsula | Near East |
| c. 600 BC | Lydian | | Anatolia | Near East |
| c. 600 BC | Carian | | Anatolia | Near East |
| c. 500 BC | Old Persian | Behistun inscription | Iran | Near East |
| c. 500-300 BC | Tamil Brahmi | cave inscriptions and potsherds in Tamil Nadu | Sri Lanka / India | South Asia |
| c. 260 BC | Middle Indo-Aryan (Prakrit) | Edicts of Ashoka (Pottery inscriptions from Anuradhapura have been dated c. 400 BC.) | India | South Asia |
| c. 170–130 BC | Pahlavi | | Iran | Near East |

== See also ==
- History of Asia
- Domesticated plants and animals of Austronesia
- Prehistoric Europe
- Prehistory
- Archaic humans in Southeast Asia
- Peopling of Southeast Asia

- Timeline of prehistory

== Works cited ==
- Dennell, Robin (2007), "'Resource-rich, stone-poor': Early hominin land use in large river systems of Northern India and Pakistan", in Michael D. Petraglia; Bridget Allchin (eds.), The Evolution and History of Human Populations in South Asia: Inter-disciplinary Studies in Archaeology, Biological Anthropology, Linguistics and Genetics, Vertebrate Paleobiology and Paleoanthropology Series, Dordrecht: Springer, pp. 41–68, ISBN 978-1-4020-5561-4.
- Dennell, Robin (2010), "'Out of Africa I': Current Problems and Future Prospects", in John G. Fleagle; et al. (eds.), Out of Africa I: The First Hominin Colonization of Eurasia, Vertebrate Paleobiology and Paleoanthropology Series, Dordrecht: Springer, pp. 247–74, ISBN 978-90-481-9036-2.
- Morwood, M. J.; O'Sullivan, P.; Susanto, E. E.; Aziz, F. (2003), "Revised age for Mojokerto 1, an early Homo erectus cranium from East Java, Indonesia", Australian Archaeology, 57: 1–4, doi:10.1080/03122417.2003.11681757, S2CID 55510294, archived from the original on 2014-03-10.
- Rightmire, G. Philip; Lordkipanidze, David (2010), "Fossil Skulls from Dmanisi: A Paleodeme Representing Early Homo in Asia", in John G. Fleagle; et al. (eds.), Out of Africa I: The First Hominin Colonization of Eurasia, Vertebrate Paleobiology and Paleoanthropology Series, Dordrecht: Springer, pp. 225–44, ISBN 978-90-481-9036-2.
- Swisher, C. C.; Curtis, G. H.; Jacob, T.; Getty, A. G.; Suprijo, A.; Widiasmoro (1994), "Age of the earliest known hominin in Java, Indonesia", Science, 263 (5150): 1118–21, Bibcode:1994Sci...263.1118S, doi:10.1126/science.8108729, PMID 8108729.
- Tchernov, E. (1987), "The age of the 'Ubeidiya Formation, and Early Pleistocene hominid site in the Jordan River Valley, Israel", Israel J. Earth Sci., 36: 3–30.
