= Phum Snay =

- ភូមិស្នាយ (Khmer)
- location in Cambodia
- 13°37′26″N 103°12′23″E
- Type: Burial site
- Periods: Bronze Age Iron Age
- Cultures: Pre-Angkorian
- Location: Preah Netr Preah District, Banteay Meanchey, Cambodia
- Region: Mekong Floodplain

History
- Abandoned: around 1500 years BP

Site notes
- Material: mound of rock, soil
- Area: 24 km^{2} (9.3 sq mi)
- Excavation dates: 2001, 2003, 2007
- Archaeologists: Dougald O’Reilly, Pheng Sitha and Thuy Chanthourn

Phum Snay (/puːm snaɪ/; Khmer: ភូមិស្នាយ, pronounced [pʰuːm snaːj]) is an Iron Age archaeological site discovered in May 2000 in Preah Neat Prey District, Banteay Meanchey Province, Northwest Cambodia, around 80 km (50 mi) from the temple ruins of Angkor. The site was excavated between 2001 and 2003 by primary excavators Dougald O’Reilly of the Australian National University, Pheng Sitha and Thuy Chanthourn. The excavation was intended to discover more about Iron Age life in Cambodia.

== Discovery ==
The site was discovered in 2000 during roadworks, that linked Phum Snay village with National Road 6. Investigations revealed the presence of a number of ancient burials associated with material including bronzes and semiprecious stones. Immediate widespread looting by the local inhabitants over an area of 24 km^{2} (9 sq mi) made a full assessment of the extent of the archaeological remains difficult. Excavations started in February 2001 on a 15 x 5 m area.

== Chronology ==
The site dates roughly between 500 BC and AD 500. These dates were not obtained from stratigraphy as many of the artifacts and burials were disturbed by looting. Chronology was therefore determined by comparison to other nearby sites with similar grave goods and mortuary rituals.

== Human remains ==
A general analysis was done of the 134 individuals identified through the minimum number of individuals method. Twenty-one burials in total were exhumed that contained human remains. The researchers noted pathological lesions in photos and written descriptions. A few specimens were x-rayed but the images yielded limited results. The majority of the injuries listed were cranial lesions. These were categorized into two groups: those caused by sharp force trauma (henceforth referred to SFT) which left small focused circles or lines and those caused by blunt force trauma (BFT,) resulting in round depressions in the scalp. SFT lesions are generally caused by sharp edged weapons, such as knives, swords and axes. Projectiles, such as arrows or those used by a slingshot should also be considered as SFT objects or items. BFT lesions result from clubs, cudgels and hammers. Perimortem injuries were identified as separate from healed injuries because they often had bone flakes adhered to the edges of the fractures. Researchers were careful to distinguish between lesions caused by violence and those caused by infectious disease.

== Results ==
=== Traumatic lesions ===
Out of the sample discovered at Phum Snay, 23.4% of the individuals showed signs of traumatic lesions, a number that is much higher than any other site in Southeast Asia. Both BFT and SFT were present within the skeletal remains, but there was a much higher rate of healed lesions than perimortem lesions. Some individuals had more than one lesion present upon the cranium. Within a sample of fifteen individuals, seventeen BFT lesions could be seen. These BFT lesions were rounded in shape, ranging in diameter from roughly 4 to 22 mm. Estimations suggest that injuries acquired by the individuals at the site were much higher than the remains can represent because a majority of assaults probably caused soft-tissue injuries, which would not be preserved in the archaeological record.

=== Burials ===
Within the Phum Snay site, two types of burials were found. These include bodies that were stretched out lying flat and pits where remains were simply in piles. The burials contained a variety of grave goods, including ceramic vessels, bronze ornaments (bangles, rings, and bells), and a large quantity of animal bones. The proportion of left forelimbs of hooved animals suggest a very particular sacrificial practice of animals within the burials. Researchers found that the manner of the burials and the goods contained within were closest in relation to the Óc Eo culture of the Mekong Delta.

=== Weapons ===
Another major find within Phum Snay was the high percentage of burials containing weapons. The graves contained swords, daggers, spearheads, and projectile points. Due to the context of burials with high rates of traumatic lesions, the presence of these weapons indicates possible military formation, and certainly an increased level of violence than is seen in other sites within Southeast Asia. The weapons and tools found within the site were made of iron with bronze adornments. This solidified the site's place within the Iron Age because iron weapons and tools had many advantages over bronze, such as the high abundance of iron within the Earth, which made the spread of iron very rapid. Also present in the burials of a number of young adult males were ornamental shoulder decorations, which further support the idea of a violence-oriented society. The lack of blunt objects within the burials is slightly puzzling due to the higher rate of BFT lesions than SFT lesions, but this could be explained if the individuals at Phum Snay wore helmets for protection.

=== Health ===
The health of the people living at Phum Snay was also determined from the burials. Rates of attrition, caries, and abscesses in the teeth of the human remains gave an idea of their dietary habits. The main result from the dentition was the presence of a social structure regarding male and female roles within the community. Rates of dental caries in females were higher than the males, which may be attributed to a sexual division of labor. If the men are out hunting, they are receiving a higher level of protein in the food they are consuming, while the females may be eating more cariogenic foods if they are back tending the fields and surrounded by starches and carbohydrates.

=== Morphological comparisons ===
Measurements were taken on the cranial and dental morphologies of the individuals found within Phum Snay to compare them with those of modern Cambodia, Vietnam, Thailand, and Laos. The morphological similarities were found from Q-mode correlation coefficients of cranial and dental metrics. The findings indicated that the morphology of individuals at Phum Snay were significantly different than any of the other groups being compared. Overall, the modern groups have less robusticity than is found in the Phum Snay morphologies.

== Archaeological significance ==
The high rates of traumatic lesions and weapons within the burials at Phum Snay suggest a society that values warriors. Fighting was an important part of life to the people, which could be indicative of increasing competition over access to exotic exchange items during the Iron Age. Furthering this idea is the general location of Phum Snay, right outside the Angkorian capital. Increasing competition over resources could have been the driving force behind the formation of a hierarchical society and organized state. The differences in morphological features between the human remains at Phum Snay and other modern Southeast Asian areas lends itself to the two-layer hypothesis. The people at Phum Snay were less affected by the substantial gene flow received by other areas of Southeast Asia.

== See also ==
- Laang Spean
- Bronze Age
- Early history of Cambodia
- Funan (Southeast Asia)
