= Osmantəpə =

Neolithic settlement near Kükü village in Azerbaijan

Osmantepe
- Osmantəpə (Azerbaijani) (Azerbaijan)
- Location within Azerbaijan
- 39°34′0″N 45°39′0″E
- Type: Settlement
- Periods: Neolithic Period
- Location: Nakhchivan, Azerbaijan

History
- Built: 9500 BC
- Abandoned: 7500 BC

Site notes
- Excavation dates: 2021
- Archaeologists: Vali Bakshaliyev
- Owner: Herder and gatherer

Osmantəpə is an early Neolithic settlement near Kükü village, in the Shahbuz District of the Nakhchivan Autonomous Republic of Azerbaijan.

== Geographical location ==
The Neolithic settlement Osmantəpə is around 2,400 metres (7,900 ft) above sea level near the village of Kükü in the Şahbuz district on the edge of the Qanlıgöl reservoir and partly underwater. The settlement area was discovered after the artefacts on the edge of the river were eroded. The location of the settlement is due to the fact that the area of the settlement is surrounded by several water sources, which the nomadic tribes could use. In order to collect the water from these springs, Shan Giray, the governor of the district, built a dam there as early as 1865, creating the artificial lake.

== Early Neolithic in the South Caucasus ==
In the South Caucasus region, archaeologists divide the Neolithic into two cultural phases, an early Pre-Pottery Neolithic, and a later ceramic Neolithic. The previous investigations of the Stone Age sites in the region including Azerbaijan showed several periods of the Stone Age from the early Paleolithic to the Neolithic, but the archaeological documentation lacks radiocarbon dates, stratigraphic connections and paleoecological data. In addition, the transition from the Epipalaeolithic cultures of the early Holocene to the Aratashen-Shulaveri-Shomutepe culture (6000-4000 BC) of the late Neolithic and the following Chalcolithic has not been sufficiently investigated before the 21st century. While there's increasing research in these areas since 2000, some problems still remain.

In older research, the material and cultural relics of the South Caucasian Neolithic were only represented by the archaeological sites of the Aratashen-Shomutepe-Shulaveri culture and the I Kültəpə culture. The I Kültəpə settlement in Nakhchivan Autonomous Republic, excavated between 1951 and 1964, is considered the oldest archaeological monument of the ceramic Neolithic. C14 measurements showed that the beginning of this settlement dates back to around 6200 BC.

In 2015, Yoshihiro Nishiaki, Farhad Guliyev and Seiji Kadowaki published their finds of Haci Elamxanli Tepe (5950-5800 BC) and Göytəpə (5650-5450 BC) and placed between them found a noticeable difference in the composition of the finds: while in the older Haci Elamxanli Tepe there were consistently less than 5% ceramic finds and more than 95% stone artifacts, in Göytəpə the ratio of the oldest to the youngest layer changed from around 10% to 90% to around 75% to 25%. According to the archaeologists, this provides evidence that, during a century and a half (5800-5650 BC), the beginning of ceramic production at Göytəpə can be surmised.

Nishiaki et al tried to clarify the chronological context of the earliest Pottery Neolithic period in the South Caucasus. According to these authors, Göytepe and Hacı Elamxanlı Tepe were the oldest farming villages in West Azerbaijan. A few other such very early Neolithic sites emerged almost simultaneously around 6000 BC in the foothills of the Lesser Caucasus Mountains. While the authors accept that plant cultivation and animal husbandry were of foreign origin in the area, not all Neolithic cultural items were brought in as a package. Instead, the authors suggest that there were also considerable autochthonous developments involving an aceramic stage. Intensive ceramic production and the trade that may come with it require a developed rural way of life and the associated sedentarism.

Akhundov (2019) represents scholars who are somewhat skeptical about autochthonous development during Caucasus Neolithic, by pointing out a lack of clear evidence for agricultural items that were domesticated in the area.

He identifies four different geographical areas of the Neolithic tradition in the Southern Caucasus: “(1) Colchis or the Black Sea coast, (2) Shomutapa or the Central Southern Caucasus, (3) Karabakh and (4) Mughan.”

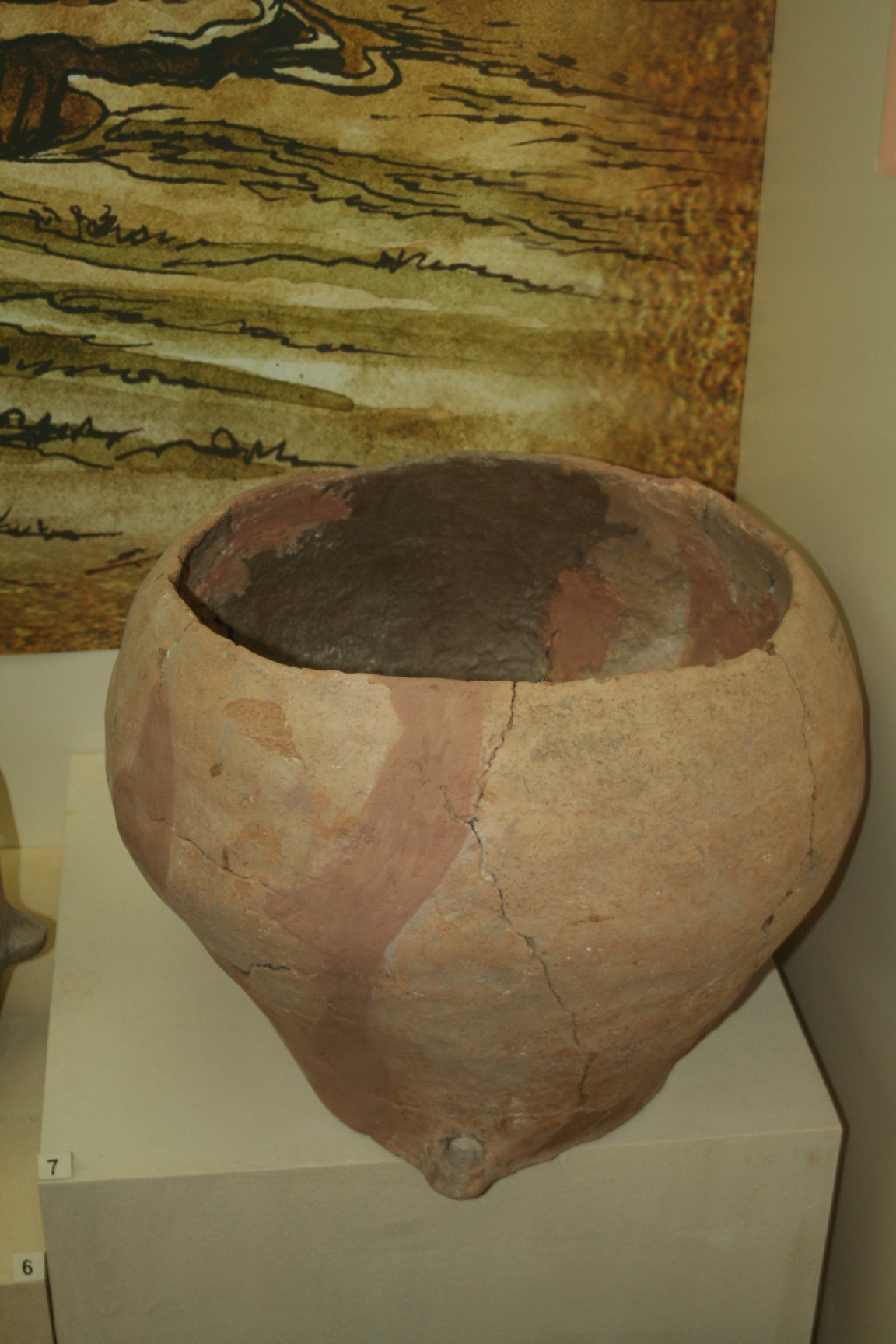
Earthenware spout vessel from Ismayilbeytepe near Xındırıstan

According to Akhundov, Ganja-Gazakh and Marneuli plains, high in the middle reaches of the Kura River feature "the earliest forms of subsistence economy based on agriculture and cattle breeding" in Caucasus. This happened starting around 6000 BC. So this developed into the "Shomutepe culture". Haci Elamxanli Tepe was the earliest such Neolithic site. Soon after, these populations started to settle areas at a lower altitude and closer to the Mughan plain. The settlement Ismailbeytepe (near Xındırıstan village in Aghdam District) is the earliest such site. And finally the Mughan plain itself was settled around 5000 BC. Alikemektepe is the best known site of this period.

Akhundov paints a complex picture of cultural development in the South Caucasus involving alternating influences first from Southwestern Asia and Anatolia, and later from Southeastern Europe.

Previous research attempting to clarify a transition between the Mesolithic cultures and the archaeological sites of the ceramic Neolithic, i.e. the gap between 5800 and 5650 BC, encountered some problems. The findings in the Osmantəpə settlement published in 2021 are helping to close this gap

== Excavation of the early Neolithic settlement Osmantəpə ==
The archaeologist in chief, Veli Bakhshaliyev, reported on the results of the excavation and investigations that a total of more than 300 obsidian tools were found in the settlement, including 8 nucleus and 159 microliths. The size of the microliths is on average about 1 to 2 centimeters. Such a large number of obsidian microliths and nuclei indicates a certain sedentariness of the producers associated with it. The presence of ceramics (albeit in small numbers) would also speak in favor of a sedentary lifestyle.

According to Baxşəliyev, the analysis of a carbon sample from the upper settlement layer indicated the dates in the 6th millennium BC. However, this settlement, unlike Kültepe I, shows that a nomadic way of life was still present here to some extent.

=== Obsidian tools and obsidian use ===
The finds are mainly represented by obsidian products. Obsidian blades predominate among the early tools. Products manufactured later have a greater variety of tools, including so-called sickle teeth (sickle-shaped curved blades). Some of the tools even have multifunctional properties. Such forms are already known from other sites of the Mesolithic and the early Neolithic.

According to Baxşəliyev, the results of the investigation of the Osmantəpə settlement could help to clarify in what way the early Neolithic settlers of Nakhichivans tapped the obsidian deposits. The obsidian tools were mainly made from the Gegham and Zangezur Mountains obsidians found in the South Caucasus which, together with the locally operated ceramic production, could speak for indigenous South Caucasian development of obsidian production during Early Neolithic.

=== Economy and settlement method ===
Veli Bakhshaliyev points out that the tool shapes with short shafts found are not known for the late Neolithic in the South Caucasus. This shows that there was a very early settlement horizon in Osmantəpə. However, the typological determination of the tools showed that the prehistoric people of the place predominantly raised cattle. The sickle teeth and the ceramics would also confirm the agricultural activities of the early Neolithic settlers. The microscopic examinations of the obsidian tools also made it clear that the archaeological site of Osmantəpə was not a temporary storage place for the transport of obsidian. There is evidence that the people lived there for a longer period of time. The extent and structure of a cultural layer uncovered and examined during the excavation would also show that people would have been permanently resident there. Since the settlement was in high mountains and the climate there is very cold in winter, archaeologists assume that the early Neolithic settlement Osmantəpə was only used seasonally.

The early Neolithic settlers lived in half-sunken pit houses. Pit houses are still used today by semi-nomadic groups who live in the traditional way on the steppe and engage in raising cattle.

== Early use of ceramics ==
According to Baxşəliyev, the discovery of small quantities of ceramics shows that the early Neolithic settlement of Osmantəpə had only just started the ceramic use in this region. The results of the investigation on obsidian microliths also support this conclusion. Thus, according to Baxşəliyev, Osmantəpə's findings help to clarify considerably the transition from the Mesolithic to the early Neolithic in the South Caucasus.

According to the archaeologists, the small number of ceramic finds at the settlement is consistent with an early phase of Ceramic Neolithic. Therefore, the settlement can be dated back to 9500-7500 BC.

== See also ==
- Goytepe archaeological complex
- Damjili Cave
