= Mineral waters of Nakhchivan =

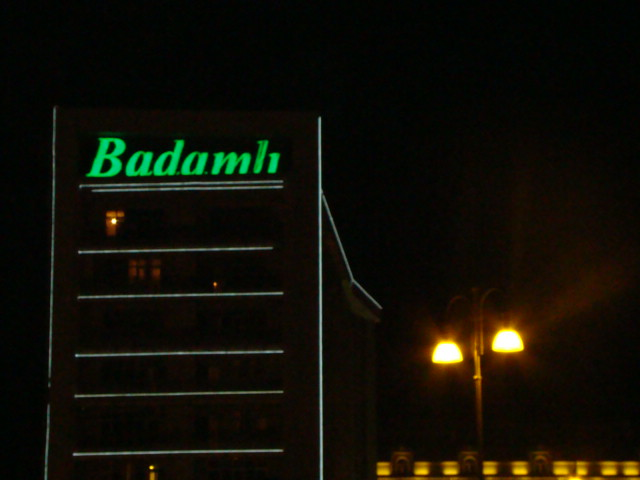
Advertisement for Badamli mineral water

Mineral waters of Nakhchivan are water springs in Nakhchivan Autonomous Republic that contain various minerals such as, sodium, potassium, magnesium, chloride and sulfur compounds.

== Overview ==
There are approximately seven thousand artesian aquifers and more than two hundred mineral water springs in Nakhchivan. Mineral water springs of Nakhchivan cover about 60% of overall water sources of Azerbaijan. Sirab, Badamli, Vaykhir, Gulustan and Daridagh are considered as the most popular water sources in Nakhchivan. They are used as a treatment and potable water sources. Research works of the mineral waters in this territory were started in the 1840s and centralized exploration works carried out there in the twentieth century. According to the investigations, there are six types, sixteen categories and thirty-three spices of mineral waters in Nakhchivan and 98% of them contain Carbon dioxide. The majority of mineral waters’ temperature is 8 °C - 22 °C. There are explored waters with 50 °C and more in Sirab and Daridagh springs. 35% of Carbon dioxide abundant mineral waters of the country are situated in Nakhchivan Autonomous Republic.

== Mineral water springs in Nakhchivan ==
=== Sirab ===
Sirab mineral water spring located in Babek district (18 kilometers north – east of Nakhchivan city) and it is 1100-meter-high from sea level in Sirab village. The origin of the word “sirab” consists of two parts “sir” and “ab” means “secret water”. There are differentiated three types of water in this spring regarding to their compositions.

- The first type is Carbon Dioxide, Hydro carbonate, sodium – potassium abundant and less mineralized. Regarding to the chemical composition, it is close to the water of Kislovodsk.
- The second one is Carbon Dioxide, Hydro Carbonate, potassium abundant and medium mineralized. It is similar to the Borjomi (Georgia).
- The third type is highly mineralized and consists of Carbon Dioxide, Arsenic, Hydro carbonate – chloride, potassium. It is related to the waters of Sinegorsk (Sakhalin) and Daridagh (Julfa).

Sirab mineral water is used as a treatment for diseases such as, liver and gastroenterostomy oriented. This mineral water exported to the countries such as, Russia, China, Turkey, Belarus, Kazakhstan, Turkmenistan, Iran, Iraq, Poland, Ukraine, Qatar, and Baltic states from Azerbaijan.

=== Badamli ===
Source of the Badamli mineral water is located 1274 meters high from the sea level in Shahbuz district (three kilometers south – west of the Badamli village) and consists of the several springs. The chemical composition of the water consists of minerals such as, Carbon Dioxide, Hydro carbonate – chloride and sodium – potassium. Badamli is Narzan (Kislovodsk) and Saqveri (Georgia) typed healing – beverage water.

=== Daridagh ===
Daridagh mineral water located in Culfa district and consists of five springs and 32 exploration wells. The source of the water is 800–900 meters high from the sea level. According to the chemical composition Daridagh mineral water is arsenic and highly mineralized chloride – hydro carbonate – sodium abundant, and close to the Kudova (Poland), La – Burbula (France), Durkheim (Germany) and Sinegorsk (Russia) mineral waters.

=== Vaykhir ===
Mineral water Vaykhir is located 1100 meters high from the sea level in Babek district. Vaykhir mineral water consists of a number of springs and two types of waters were found from the central well.

- Yessentuki typed medium mineralized, Carbon dioxide, hydro carbonate – chloride and sodium – potassium abundant water.
- Sirab and Soymi typed low mineralized, Carbon dioxide and hydro carbonate – potassium – sodium.

Vaykhir mineral water is beneficial for the treatment of diseases such as, hepatitis, inflammation of gallbladder, chronic gastritis and chronic colitis.

=== Gulustan ===
Gulustan mineral water is Sirab and Kislovodsk typed and located in Culfa district. The well was dug in 1962 and is more than 130 meters deep. Chemical composition consists of magnesium, sodium, potassium, carbonate and carbon dioxide and mostly used as a treatment for gastroenterostomy diseases.

=== Batabat ===
Batabat mineral water is located 1700 high from the sea level in the north – east of the Nakhchivan city. Magnesium, hydro carbonated, sodium – potassium abundant water is beneficial for gastroentric diseases.
