= Remeşin =

Remeşin or Rameshin or Remeshin may refer to:

- Aşağı Remeşin, Azerbaijan
- Yuxarı Remeşin, Azerbaijan
