= Ağbulaq necropolis =

Archeological site in Azerbaijan

- Location: Shahbuz district, Nakhchivan, Azerbaijan

Site notes
- Excavation dates: Novruzlu Ə.İ., Bakhshaliyev V.B.
- Discovered: During agricultural work
- Two graves were excavated. First jar faced west and had a large black bowl with a single handle. Agate and glass beads, fragments of clay pots, beads, bronze pins, rings and bells, 1 piece of copper money, and other material culture samples were found during excavation.

The Ağbulaq necropolis is an archeological site of antiquity located in the territory of Shahbuz district of Nakhchivan, Azerbaijan. Novruzlu Ə.İ. and Bakhshaliyev V.B. conducted research in the necropolis. The graves consist of large jars. According to the researchers, this necropolis was discovered during agricultural work. The grave was destroyed by the tractor, and large fragments of the jar were scattered around. Large rock fragments were found in the destroyed area. Two graves were excavated. The mouth of the first jar was to the north-west, facing west. It is surrounded by a row of rectangular stones. At the mouth of the cube is a large black bowl with a single handle. The inside of the cube was filled with soil, and the skeletal remains were rotted and pressed. During the cleaning of the cube, agate and glass beads, fragments of clay pots, beads, bronze pins, rings and bells, 1 piece of copper money and other material culture samples were obtained.

== See also ==
- Ağbulaq, Nakhchivan
