= Tirkesh =

Tirkesh may refer to:

- Tirkesh, Azerbaijan
- Tirkesh, Iran (disambiguation)
