= Tarkesh =

Tarkesh or Tarkash or Terkesh (Persian: تركش), also rendered as Tirkesh, may refer to:

- Tərkeş, Azerbaijan
- Tarkash, East Azerbaijan
- Tarkesh-e Olya, West Azerbaijan Province
- Tarkesh-e Sofla, West Azerbaijan Province
- Tarkesh Coffee Company, West Azerbaijan Province
