= Mahmudoba =

Mahmudoba may refer to:

- Mahmudoba, Khachmaz, Azerbaijan
- Mahmudoba, Shahbuz, Azerbaijan
