= Qızıl Qışlaq =

- Qızıl Qışlaq, Fuzuli
- Qızıl Qışlaq, Shahbuz
