= Keçili =

Keçili or Kechili or Ketschily or Kechilli may refer to:

- Keçili, Shakhbuz, Azerbaijan
- Keçili, Shamkir, Azerbaijan
- Kechilikaya, Azerbaijan
- Keçili, Amasya, Turkey
- Keçili, Bucak, Turkey
- Keçili, Gadabay, Turkey
- Keçili, Oğuzeli, Turkey
- Keçili, Olur, Turkey
- Keçili, Yüksekova, Turkey
