= St. Astvatsatsin Church (Aghbulag) =

Armenian church in Nakhchivan, Azerbaijan

St. Astvatsatsin Church of Kzhadzor
- Կժաձորի Սուրբ Գևորգ եկեղեցի
- St. Astvatsatsin Church of Kzhadzor
- Location: Ağbulaq, Nakhchivan
- Country: Azerbaijan
- Denomination: Armenian Apostolic Church

History
- Status: Destroyed
- Founded: 12th or 13th century

Architecture
- Style: basilica
- Demolished: 1997–2009

St. Astvatsatsin Church was an Armenian church located in the village of Aghbulag (Shahbuz District) of the Nakhchivan Autonomous Republic of Azerbaijan. It was located in the central part of the village.

== History ==
The church was founded in the 12th or 13th century and was renovated in the 17th century. The church once supported a large congregation, according to the colophon of a gospel written in Shorot village in 1667.

== Architecture ==
The church was a basilica-style structure with single nave, two aisles, two vestries, and hall.

== Destruction ==
The church was a still standing and well-preserved monument in the late Soviet period. It was listed on the 1988 list of Historical and Cultural Monuments of the Azerbaijan SSR under inventory number 2855. However, it was destroyed at some point between 1997 and November 11, 2009, as documented by Caucasus Heritage Watch.
