= Azizbeyov =

Azizbeyov may refer to:

- Mashadi Azizbeyov, Soviet revolutionary

Places named for Mashadi Azizbeyov:

- Azizbeyov, Goranboy, a village in Azerbaijan
- Azizbeyov, Goygol, a village in Azerbaijan

Places formerly called Azizbeyov:

- Aregnadem, Armenia
- Daylaqlı, a village and municipality in Azerbaijan
- Khazar raion, a raion (district) in Azerbaijan
- Vayk, Armenia
- Zaritap, Armenia
