= St. Khach Monastery of Agarak (Kulus) =

Ruinous Armenian monastery in the Nakhchivan Autonomous Republic of Azerbaijan

- Սուրբ Խաչ վանք
- Location: Külüs
- Country: Azerbaijan
- Denomination: Armenian Apostolic Church

History
- Status: Destroyed
- Founded: 10th or 11th century

Architecture
- Demolished: 1997–2009

St. Khach Monastery was a ruinous Armenian monastery in the abandoned village of Agarak, near the village of Kulus (Shahbuz District) of the Nakhchivan Autonomous Republic of Azerbaijan. It was situated on a terrace on the slope of a hill, approximately 500-600m northwest of Agarak (abandoned in 1825), some 2 km north of modern Kulus.

== History ==
The monastery was founded in the 10th or 11th century and renovated in 1451 and 1600.

== Architecture ==
It was a single nave structure with a vaulted hall, semicircular apse with vestries on either side, and entrance in the west. There were Armenian inscriptions in the interior. Surrounding the church were auxiliary monastic buildings and an outer wall, which were in ruins by the late Soviet years.

== Destruction ==
The monastery had been a target of destruction in the Soviet period and in the late Soviet period the monastery was already reduced to rubble. The remnants of the monastery were completely erased at some point between 1997 and November 11, 2009, as documented by Caucasus Heritage Watch.
