= St. Khach Monastery (Shada) =

Ruinous Armenian monastery in the Nakhchivan Autonomous Republic of Azerbaijan

- Kamu Khach Monastery
- Սուրբ Խաչ վանք; Քամու խաչ վանք
- St. Khach Monastery
- Location: Şada
- Country: Azerbaijan
- Denomination: Armenian Apostolic Church

History
- Status: Destroyed
- Founded: 11th or 12th century

Architecture
- Demolished: 1997–2008

St. Khach or Kamu Khach Monastery was a ruinous Armenian monastery located near the village of Shada (Shahbuz District) of the Nakhchivan Autonomous Republic of Azerbaijan. The monastery was situated on the slope of a hill, approximately 2-2.5 km south of the village.

== History ==
The monastery was founded in the 11th or 12th century and underwent renovations in the 15th, 17th and 19th centuries.

The monastery was a well-known monastic complex. Only the church of the complex was still extant in the late Soviet period; the refectory, auxiliary buildings, and outer wall were already destroyed. The church was a basilica structure with a rectilinear apse, two vestries, and hall. There were Armenian inscriptions on the interior.

The remainings of the monastery complex were completely razed at some point between 1997 and August 29, 2008, as documented by Caucasus Heritage Watch.
