= St. Yerrordutyun Church (Nursu) =

Armenian church in Nursu, Nakhchivan, Azerbaijan

St. Yerrordutyun Church of Nors
- Նորսի Սուրբ Երրորդություն եկեղեցի
- St. Yerrordutyun Church of Nors
- Location: Nursu
- Country: Azerbaijan
- Denomination: Armenian Apostolic Church

History
- Status: Destroyed
- Founded: 13th or 14th century

Architecture
- Style: basilica
- Demolished: 1997–2009

St. Yerrordutyun Church was an Armenian church located in the village of Nursu (Shahbuz District) of the Nakhchivan Autonomous Republic of Azerbaijan. It was located in the western part of the village.

== History ==
The church was founded in the 13th or 14th century. According to an Armenian inscription on a khachkar in the tympanum of the western entryway, the church was renovated in 1654. It was also renovated in 1875. The church was standing but in poor condition in the late Soviet years; part of the roof had collapsed, the northern vestry was in ruins, and parts of the walls were damaged or cracking.

== Architecture ==
The church was a basilica-style structure consisting of a nave, two aisles, a seven-sided apse, and two vestries, with entries on the north and west. There was an Armenian inscription on the western facade.

== Destruction ==
The church was a standing monument in the late Soviet period. It was listed on the 1988 list of Historical and Cultural Monuments of the Azerbaijan SSR under inventory number 2854. The church was razed to ground at some point between 1997 and November 11, 2009, as documented by Caucasus Heritage Watch.
