= St. Grigor Church (Kulus) =

Armenian church in the Nakhchivan Autonomous Republic of Azerbaijan

- Սուրբ Գրիգոր եկեղեցի
- St. Grigor Church
- Location: Külüs
- Country: Azerbaijan
- Denomination: Armenian Apostolic Church

History
- Status: Destroyed
- Founded: 13th or 14th century

Architecture
- Style: basilica
- Demolished: 1997–2009

St. Grigor Church was an Armenian church located in the village of Kulus (Shahbuz District) of the Nakhchivan Autonomous Republic of Azerbaijan. It was located in the southwestern part of the village.

== History ==
The church was founded in the 13th or 14th century and was renovated in 1657.

== Architecture ==
It was a basilica-style church consisting of two aisles and a nave, an apse, two vestries, and a hall. Entryways were on the west and south. There were Armenian inscriptions on the interior. Its distinctive roof, with a curved form that gives the impression of a dome, is characteristic of the Persian-Armenian community of Isfahan.

== Destruction ==
The church was a standing monument in the late Soviet period. It was listed on the 1988 list of Historical and Cultural Monuments of the Azerbaijan SSR under inventory number 2853. The church was destroyed at some point between 1997 and November 11, 2009, as documented by Caucasus Heritage Watch.
