= Zham Church (Badamly) =

Armenian church in the Nakhchivan Autonomous Republic of Azerbaijan

- Zham Church
- 39.449364°N 45.533766°E
- Location: Badamlı
- Country: Azerbaijan
- Denomination: Armenian Apostolic Church

History
- Status: Destroyed
- Founded: 1195

Architecture
- Demolished: 1997–2009

Zham Church was an Armenian church located in the village of Badamly (Shahbuz District) of the Nakhchivan Autonomous Republic of Azerbaijan. It was located in the southeastern part of the village.

== History ==
The church was founded in 1195 and was renovated between the 16th and 18th centuries.

== Architecture ==
Zham Church was a single-naved structure with an apse, vestries, and hall, and with an entryway in the western facade that bore an Armenian inscription. Originally it was a vaulted structure, however, after renovations the church was given a flat roof.

== Destruction ==
The church was still a standing monument in the late Soviet period. It was destroyed at some point between 1997 and August 26, 2009, as documented by Caucasus Heritage Watch.
