= Badamlısu =

- Municipality
- Location within Azerbaijan
- Coordinates: 39°25′38″N 45°31′05″E
- Country: Azerbaijan
- Autonomous republic: Nakhchivan
- District: Shahbuz

Population (2008)
  - Total: 635
- Time zone: UTC+4 (AZT)

Badamlı (also, Badamly, until 2003; Badamlısu and Badamlysu) is a settlement and municipality in the Shahbuz District of Nakhchivan, Azerbaijan. It is located in the near of the Shahbuz-Badamly highway, 12 km in the south-west from the district center. Its population is busy with animal husbandry and mainly engaged in the production of mineral water Badamly. There are secondary school, culture house, library and a communication branch in the settlement. It has a population of 635.

== History ==
It is located in the southern slope of the ridge of the Daralayaz. The settlement was built in 1964 on the basis of the Badamly mineral water plant.
