= St. Astvatsatsin Monastery (Badamly) =

Armenian monastery in the Nakhchivan Autonomous Republic of Azerbaijan

- Սուրբ Աստվածածին վանք
- St. Astvatsatsin Monastery
- Location: Badamlı
- Country: Azerbaijan
- Denomination: Armenian Apostolic Church

History
- Status: Destroyed
- Founded: 12th or 13th century

Architecture
- Demolished: 1997–2008

St. Astvatsatsin Monastery was an Armenian monastery located near the village of Badamly (Shahbuz District) of the Nakhchivan Autonomous Republic of Azerbaijan. The monastery was located approximately 600–700m east of the village.

== History ==
The monastery was founded in the 12th or 13th century and was renovated in 1610 and 1651–1671.

It was a major medieval monastic center. A colophon of a gospel copied here in 1292 records that the monastery had a sizable congregation and was the seat of an Armenian bishop.

== Architecture ==
In the late Soviet period the only standing building of the monastic complex was the church. The church was a basilica structure with a rounded dome, apse, two vestries, and a hall, and was accessed through doorways on the western and southern sides. There were Armenian inscriptions on interior walls and on the dome. The interior southern facade was also adorned with relief sculptures, as were the doorways.

== Destruction ==
In the late Soviet period the only standing building of the monastic complex was the church. The monastery was listed on the 1988 list of Historical and Cultural Monuments of the Azerbaijan SSR under inventory number 2857. The monastery was razed to ground at some point between 1997 and July 28, 2008, as documented by Caucasus Heritage Watch.
