= St. Nshan Monastery (Kuku) =

Ruinous Armenian monastery in Nakhchivan, Azerbaijan

- Hazarabyurats Monastery
- Սուրբ Նշան վանք; Հազարաբյուրաց վանք
- St. Nshan Monastery
- Location: Kükü
- Country: Azerbaijan
- Denomination: Armenian Apostolic Church

History
- Status: Destroyed
- Founded: 13th century

Architecture
- Demolished: 2003–2009

St. Nshan or Hazarabyurats Monastery was a ruinous Armenian monastery located near the village of Kuku (Shahbuz District) of the Nakhchivan Autonomous Republic of Azerbaijan. It was located on the slope of a hill, approximately 700m north of the village.

== History ==
The monastery was founded in the middle of the 13th century and was renovated in the 15th and 17th centuries.

== Architecture ==
The monastery was a domed structure with three apses, four vestries, and a doorway on the west that opened onto a porch. There were Armenian inscriptions on the interior. A vaulted structured to the west of the church was probably serving as a library.

== Destruction ==
The monastery complex was in ruins in the late Soviet period. The ruinous complex was in the process of further destruction in May 2003 and it was completely erased by April 26, 2009, as documented by Caucasus Heritage Watch.
