= Northern Artsakh =

Northern Artsakh, the northern part of historical Artsakh province. The land is located to the north of the Murovdağ (Mrav) mountain range. It used to be a part of the Armenian historical provinces of Artsakh and Utik, but was never part of the former breakaway state Republic of Artsakh at its maximum territorial extent (1994-2020). During the history the province of Artsakh has had different borders at different times, so this term has been used to refer to different territories. In the narrow sense, it may cover an area of about 2,000 square kilometers^{α}, but sometimes in different sources, based on political context, some provinces of another Armenian historical province, Utik, are included under this name. From the Karabakh movement of 1988 until the Operation Goranboy of 1992, the Armenian population was finally depopulated.

== History ==
Artsakh or Lesser Syunik was the 10th province of the Kingdom of Greater Armenia (331 BC - 428 AD). In the early Middle Ages, Artsakh was included in the Persian-subjugated Caucasian Albania (428-705) and the "first Arminia" province of the Arab-subjugated Arminiya Governorate (705-885). During this period, the borders of Artsakh remained almost unchanged, and northern Artsakh consisted mainly of its two provinces, Koght and Kust-i-Parnes (Parisos).

In the High Middle Ages, with the creation of the Kingdom of Parisos, northern Artsakh briefly separated from the other provinces of Artsakh and temporarily joined Gardman, but later joined the semi-independent principality (kingdom) of Artsakh, 1000-1261, and its successor, the Principality of Khachen (1261-1603).

== Notes ==
- ^αNorthern Artsakh includes the provinces of Koght and Kust-i-Parnes, which were occupied by the Azerbaijani SSR and divided into Dashkesan (1047 km^{2}) and Shahumyan (630 km^{2}), as well as several Armenian villages between them, Xanlar (the total area is 920 km^{2}, which was partially outside the borders of Artsakh). The Armenian territories, which were included in these regions, were parts of various state formations of Artsakh or were separate administrative units and melikdoms for some time, but were never united with the Utik's Gardman province only in one period, during the reign of Gardman-Parisos. Meanwhile, in addition to them, the Utik's Gardman, Shakashen, Tuchkatak and other provinces were referred to as "Northern Artsakh" by only one author, Samvel Karapetyan, in the work of the same name. Gardman, being a separate principality, existed in the early Middle Ages, and Shakashen was not included in the Armenian states after the division in 387 (Bagratid Armenia, Zakarid Armenia). As for the Tuchkatak province, it has always been part of various Armenian statehoods, but never of Artsakh. The author himself notes in the book that he calls several provinces of Utik and the north of Artsakh “Northern Artsakh”, in his words, “conditionally”.
