= Yusif Mirzayev =

- Yusif Vali oglu Mirzayev
- Yusif Mirzayev - National Hero of Azerbaijan
- Born: May 23, 1958; Böyükdüz, Kangarli District, Nakhchivan AR, Azerbaijan SSR
- Died: February 19, 1993 (aged 34); Aghdere, Tartar Rayon, Azerbaijan
- Burial place: Nakhchivan, Azerbaijan
- Occupation: Military
- Awards: National Hero of Azerbaijan; 1993

Yusif Mirzayev (Azerbaijani: Yusif Vəli oğlu Mirzəyev) (23 May 1958 – 19 February 1993) was an Azerbaijani soldier and participant of the First Nagorno-Karabakh War. He was posthumously awarded the title of the National Hero of Azerbaijan.

== Life ==
Mirzayev was born on 23 May 1958 in the Böyükdüz village of the Kangarli District of the Nakhchivan Autonomous Republic of Azerbaijan. He graduated from secondary school #1 named after I. Safarali in Nakhchivan in 1975. He started his career at Nakhchivan Communication Center in 1976. He was working and studying at Azerbaijani State Agricultural Institute (present Baku State University of Economics) in the faculty of Accounting at the same time. He was appointed as an auditor in one of the banks in Baku and graduated from the university in 1987.

Mirzayev joined the National Movement in 1988. During the Black January events of 1990, Russian soldiers captured and tortured him.

== In battles ==
He joined the army in 1991 during the First Nagorno-Karabakh War. Mirzayev's first battle took place at the crossroads between Aghdara and Goranboy. He became an active fighter in a very short time and gained military knowledge as well. Thus, he was appointed as a Deputy Procurement by his commanders. He died in a battle while helping soldiers to break the siege in Aghdara region on 19 February 1993.

== Family ==
Mirzayev was married and had a daughter.

== Recognition ==
He was posthumously awarded the title of the National Hero of Azerbaijan by the decree # 495 of the President of Azerbaijan on 27 March 1993.

He was buried at the Nakhchivan city Alley of Martyrs.

One of the schools in Nakhchivan city as well as the school # 44 in Nasimi District of Baku is named after him. There is also a monument of him in the school yard.

His close friend, Azerbaijani singer Shamistan Alizamanli, dedicated his song "Brave Soldier" to him.
