= Bulghan =

Bulghan may refer to:

- Bulugan, Empress of the Mongol Yuan Empire.
- Bulqan, Azerbaijan
