= Bulqan =

- Municipality
- Location within Azerbaijan
- Coordinates: 39°10′53″N 45°22′58″E
- Country: Azerbaijan
- Autonomous republic: Nakhchivan

Population (2005)
  - Total: 1,150
- Time zone: UTC+4 (AZT)

Bulqan
- Simplified Chinese: 布尔干
Transcriptions

Bulqan (also, Bulgan and Bulghan) is a village and municipality in the Nakhchivan city of Nakhchivan Autonomous Republic, Azerbaijan. It is located 5 km in the south from the city center, on the bank of the Araz River. Its population is busy with grain-growing, vegetable-growing, animal husbandry, fruit-growing and horticulture. It has a population of 1,150. A 12th to 19th century necropolis, now mostly submerged, is registered with the Ministry of Culture and Tourism.

== Etymology ==
According to sources at certain stages of history, the Bulgars who came to Azerbaijan were separated to the branches as bulgan, chakar, kuyvar, kuruqir, gul, gazan, iskilv and have spread in different areas of Azerbaijan. Most likely, the name of the village was formed at the result of the phonetic transformation of the tribal name Bolgar (Bolgar-Bulgar-Bulgan).

== History ==
Bulqan is one of the oldest settlements of the Nakhchivan. There was the settlement of the Middle Ages in the territory of the village. The old Bulqan village was situated on the bank of the Araz River, and in the 1963–1969 years in connection of the construction of the Araz Water Reservoir it was moved from the previous location to its present area. In the 19th century and earlier periods in the village were lived 29 families belonging to the Gyzylkyshlak tribe of the Kengerli, the land areas of the village was owned by Amir Suar and three brothers, in the area were planted more wheat and barley. The summer pasture of the Gyzylkyshlak tribes, also the families belonging to the Alikhanly tribe of the Kengerli tribes, were present Aşağı Qışlaq and Yuxarı Qışlaq villages which were known in the 19th century as "Ali Memmed kyshlak", "Gullu kyshlak", "Kalanchy kyshlak" and "Maghara Kyshlak", these villages were founded by the Kengerli tribes.

Since June 9, 2009, by the decree of the President of the Azerbaijan Republic, the Bulgan village of the Babek District is included in the scope of the administrative territorial unit of Nakhchivan city.

== Historical and archaeological monuments ==
=== Bulgan ===
Bulgan - is the settlement of the Middle Ages in the Nakhchivan city, near the same named village. Some of the remains of a square-shaped building are preserved; below part built from the pebbles and the upper part from the crude bricks. Surface materials which belonged to the different eras, consists of fragments of cooked simple and glazed pots in pink color. According to the findings, it is believed that the Bulqan settlement belongs to the 12th-18th centuries.

=== Bulqan Necropolis ===
Bulqan Necropolis - the archaeological monument in the Nakhchivan city, near the same named village. Here were found several grave monuments. Most of the graves are sunken, in its place were left the square holes. The head parts of most of the graves was broken. The upper part of some of the gravestones were completed in the crown form. It is assumed that the findings belongs to the 12th-19th centuries.
