= Əlinağılar =

- Municipality
- Location within Azerbaijan
- Coordinates: 40°29′N 45°45′E
- Country: Azerbaijan
- Rayon: Gadabay

Population
  - Total: 1,320
- Time zone: UTC+4 (AZT)
  - Summer (DST): UTC+5 (AZT)

Əlinağılar (also, Alinagylar) is a village and municipality in the Gadabay Rayon of Azerbaijan. It has a population of 1,320. The municipality consists of the villages of Əlinağılar and Arısu with which it essentially merges, along with nearby Miskinli and (across the river) Qalakənd to form one larger diffuse village.
