= Shapurgala =

Shahbuz gala- Shapurgala
- Azerbaijani: Şapurqala
- Location within Azerbaijan

General information
- Type: Fortress
- Location: Shahbuz, Nakhchivan Autonomous Republic, Azerbaijan
- Coordinates: 39.359618°N 45.661883°E
- Completed: I-X centuries

Technical details
- Material: Brick

Shapurgala (Azerbaijani: Şapurqala) is a fortress located on the left bank of Nakhchivanay, near the village with the same name in the Shahbuz District of Nakhchivan Autonomous Republic.

== See also ==
- Architecture of Azerbaijan
