= Şada =

Village in the Shahbuz District of Nakhchivan, Azerbaijan

- Municipality
- Location within Azerbaijan
- Coordinates: 39°29′10″N 45°29′40″E
- Country: Azerbaijan
- Autonomous republic: Nakhchivan District

Population (2005)
  - Total: 164
- Time zone: UTC+4 (AZT)

Şada (also, Sada, Shada, Shadakend, and Shady) is a village and the least populous municipality in the Shahbuz District of Nakhchivan, Azerbaijan. It is located 18 km in the north-west from the district center, on the slope of the Daralayaz ridge. There is a secondary school, library, and a medical center in the village. It has a population of 164.

== Qaraboya ==
Qaraboya (also, Garaboya and Karaboya) - the existed village on the slope of the Ov Mountain in the Shahbuz district. Its population have been resettled in the Shada and Badamlı villages in 1960.

== Monuments ==
St. Khach or Kamu Khach Monastery was a ruinous Armenian monastery located approximately 2-2.5 km south of the village. The monastery was founded in the 11th or 12th century and was in a ruinous condition in the late Soviet period. It was razed at some point between 1997 and 2008.

== See also ==
- St. Khach Monastery (Shada)
