= Mahmudoba, Shahbuz =

Mahmudoba
- Municipality
- Location within Azerbaijan
- Coordinates: 39°24′35″N 45°37′42″E
- Country: Azerbaijan
- Autonomous republic: Nakhchivan
- District: Shahbuz

Population (2005)
  - Total: 794
- Time zone: UTC+4 (AZT)

Mahmudoba (also, Makhmudoba and Mahmud-oba) is a village and municipality in the Shahbuz District of Nakhchivan, Azerbaijan. It is located 6 km in the north-east from the district center, on the foothill area. Its population is busy with vine-growing, farming and animal husbandry. There are secondary school, library, kindergarten, club and a medical center in the village. It has a population of 794. There are a Kəhriz (underground channel) in the southwest of the village, on the right bank of the Guruchay valley, the medieval settlements of the Ordu yurdu in the north-west, and the Məzrə and Mahmudoba in the north-east.

== Etymology ==
The name of the village is composed of the name of Mahmud (person's name) and the word of oba (hamlet, large nomad family) from the Turkic languages, means "Mahmud's hamlet", "the hamlet which belongs to Mahmud".

== History ==
Məzrə (Mazra) - the existed village in the Sahbuz district. Its population moved to the villages of the Nursu and Mahmudoba in 1959.

== Historical and archaeological monuments ==
=== Ordu Yurdu (Land of Army) ===
Ordu Yurdu (Land of Army) - the place of residence of the 7th-8th centuries in the north-west of the village of Mahmudoba in the Shahbuz rayon. Its area is 5 hectares. It is located on the low hills, surrounded from the both sides by the valley of the Guruchay. Cultural layer was kept. At the result of the surface searches, are collected the fragments of the clay pot in the pink colored. There are the remains of the wall in the part of the place of residence which called "Qərincə". Along the slope of the hill at a distance of approximately 30 m, the wide of the wall which was left unharmed is 1 m. At present, the place of residence is surrounded by plant fields on either side.

=== Mazra ===
Mazra - the place of residence of the 13th-17th centuries in the territory of the Shahbuz rayon. Slightly above from the ruins of the former village of Məzrə (Mazra). Was recorded in 1986. Its area is 5200 m2. Have been found the remains of building, in some places, the square towers. The cultural layer in its area was completely destroyed during the farm works. The surface materials consists of the unglazed (hilt, pitcher, jar-style containers etc.) and glazed (bowl and plate-type containers) from the ceramic products, as well as from the plates decorated with geometric and floral patterns which has been worked with the brush on white transparent coating. There is a Muslim necropolis on the slope of the hill, in the south-east of the Mazra settlement.

=== Mahmudoba ===
Mahmudoba - the settlement of the 13th-17th centuries in the north-east of the same named village of the Shahbuz district. Its area is 1400 m2. The remains of the building and the remains of a rectangular-planned house were barely monitored. At the result of the exploratory (5х5 m size) drilling, the deep cultural layer on the 1.5–2 meters were identified, the glazed and unglazed pottery (pot, jar, lamp, etc.) and the material-cultural samples were discovered.
