= Mərəlik =

- Municipality
- Location within Azerbaijan
- Coordinates: 39°22′35″N 45°30′08″E
- Country: Azerbaijan
- Autonomous republic: Nakhchivan
- District: Shahbuz

Population (2005)
  - Total: 212
- Time zone: UTC+4 (AZT)

Mərəlik (also, Maralıq, Maralik, Merelik, and Maralyk) is a village and municipality in the Shahbuz District of Nakhchivan, Azerbaijan. It is located near the Yevlakh-Lachin-Nakhchivan highway, 8 km west from the district center. Its population is busy with farming and animal husbandry. There are a primary a school, a club, a library and a medical center in the village. It has a population of 212.

== Etymology ==
The name of the village consists of the məra (meaning "common pasture; pastures") and from the suffix -lıq meaning "place of", location in Azerbaijani language, means "the location of pasture, the place of pasture".
