= Keçili, Shahbuz =

Keçili
- Municipality
- Location within Azerbaijan
- Coordinates: 39°22′17″N 45°43′03″E
- Country: Azerbaijan
- Autonomous republic: Nakhchivan
- District: Shahbuz

Population (2005)
  - Total: 1,702
- Time zone: UTC+4 (AZT)

Keçili (also, Kechili and Kechilli) is a village and the most populous municipality, except for the capital Şahbuz, in the Shahbuz District of Nakhchivan, Azerbaijan. It is located 20 km north of the district center, on the slope of the Zangezur ridge. Its population is busy with gardening and animal husbandry. There are a secondary school, library, culture house, club and hospital in the village. It has a population of 1,702. Nearby are registered the place of residence of the medieval, Kollug (5th-8th centuries) and the place of residence of the medieval, Kechili (9th-12th centuries).

== Origin and etymology ==
The Kecililər are an ancient Turkic tribe. They originate from the Kayı tribe of the Oghuz Turks. They came to Azerbaijan together with Oghuz tribes from Seljuk in the 11th century. In the sources of the nineteenth century (1816), it was noted that the tayfaye-kecililər (the tribe of kechililer) were living in the territory of the Nakhchivan (at the left bank of the Araz River) and intermingled with the kangars during the reign Safavid. The name of the Kechili village is related with Kecililər.

== Historical and archaeological monuments ==
=== Kolluq ===
Kolluq is the settlement of the early Middle Ages, near the Kechili village of Shahbuz rayon, on the left bank of a small mountain river. Its area is 160 m2. It was recorded in 1990. From each side of the residence are hay fields. There have been found the remains of the building, fragments of pink-colored pottery in the area. On the opposite side of the residence, on the right bank of the river preserved temple ruins. The findings show that the place of residence of Kollug belongs to the 5th-8th centuries.

=== Kechili ===
Kechili is the place of residence of the Middle Ages in the east of the same named village in the Shahbuz rayon. Its area is 1400 m2. The place of the door of the rectangular rooms, built from the stone were monitored. At the result of the surface research, were collected a considerable amount of ware of the glazed and unglazed pottery (big pitcher, jug, pot, lid, jar-type containers), construction materials, light and the remains of an iron object. It is supposed that the place of residence belongs to the 9th-13th centuries.
