= Şahbuzkənd =

- Municipality
- Location within Azerbaijan
- Coordinates: 39°22′43″N 45°34′45″E
- Country: Azerbaijan
- Autonomous republic: Nakhchivan
- District: Shahbuz

Population (2005)
  - Total: 1,197
- Time zone: UTC+4 (AZT)

Şahbuzkənd (also, Shahbuzkand, Kənd Şahbuz and Kend Shahbuz) is a village and municipality in the Shahbuz District of Nakhchivan, Azerbaijan. It is located in the near of the Shahbuz-Kechili highway, 7 km in the south-east from the district center, on the foothill area. Its population is busy with gardening and animal husbandry. There are secondary school, library, club, kindergarten and a medical center in the village. It has a population of 1,197.

== Etymology ==
The toponym of the Shahbuzkand is related with the fortress which existed in the early Middle Ages and remained the ruins, and the name of the fortress is connected with the name of the mountain Şahbuztəpə. Nearby there is Köhnə qala (the old castle) the place of residence of the medieval period.

The name of the Şahbuztəpə, made out from the components of the Şah (high, large), buz // bus (in the Turkic languages, "the ledge, the mountain"), təpə "hill" and means "the high mountain", "the hill with the large ledge".

== Historical and archaeological monuments ==
=== Köhnəgala ===
Köhnəgala - the settlement of the Middle Ages, near the Shahbuzkand village in the Shahbuz rayon. It was registered in 1990. Its area is more than 10 hectares. It is surrounded on all sides by steep cliffs. During archaeological researches were found the fragments of pottery. The remains of a stone wall on the south-eastern part of Köhnəqala is observed from a distance of 150 m. Surface materials consists, from the iron things (most likely a knife blade), the products of unglazed (pot, kettle-type containers etc.) and glazed (bowl, plate-type containers, lamp etc.) ceramic, fragments of glass. The settlement belongs to the 14th-18th centuries.

=== Shahbuzkand Necropolis ===
Shahbuzkand Necropolis - the archaeological monument of the Middle Ages in the territory of the Sahbuzkənd village. The head and chest stones of the Muslim cemetery are destroyed. According to the gravestone ram figures in the cemetery, it is supposed that the monument belongs to the 15th-16th centuries.
