= Kolanı, Nakhchivan =

Kolanı
- Municipality
- Location within Azerbaijan
- Coordinates: 39°27′06″N 45°40′56″E
- Country: Azerbaijan
- Autonomous republic: Nakhchivan
- District: Shahbuz

Population (2005)
  - Total: 1,662
- Time zone: UTC+4 (AZT)

Kolanı (also, Kelany and Kolany) is a village and municipality in the Shahbuz District of Nakhchivan, Azerbaijan. It is located in the left side of the Yevlakh-Lachin-Nakhchivan highway, 10 km in the north-east from the district center, on the bank of the Nakhchivanchay River. Its population is busy with gardening and animal husbandry. There are secondary school, culture house, kindergarten, library and hospital in the village. It has a population of 1,662. Nearby the village have been discovered settlements and cemeteries of the medieval, Söyüdlü and in the south-west Quzey.

== Origin and Etymology ==
Kolanılar are an ancient Turkic tribe. According to the researchers, in the first half of the 18th century, Kolanılar has been moved from Khorasan by the Iranian Shah, Nadir Shah Afshar. In the middle of the 18th century - the first half of the 19th century, the territory of the Kolanılar which were living in the Karabakh Khanate, was called the Kolanı district. The 19th century Azerbaijan historian Mirza Adygozel has named the bank of the Tartar River from the Ushajyg village up to Goyche province, as the territory of the Kolanılar. In the 19th century, the tribe of Kolanılar consisting from 282 families were lived in the Javad province. Later, they settled in different places. According to the sources, during the attack of the Mohammad Shah Qajar to the Karabakh, some part of the tribes, including the Kolanılar, have moved and settled in the Nakhchivan, Shirvan and in the other areas. The name of the Kolanı village of the Shahbuz district of Nakhchivan is related with the tribe of the Kolanılar.

== Historical and archaeological monuments ==
=== Söyüdlü ===
Söyüdlü - the place of residence of the Middle Ages in the north from the Kolany village of the Shahbuz rayon. It is located on the slope of the high hill. Its area is 12,500 m2. The remains of the destroyed building are clearly visible. The cultural layer was preserved. Surface materials consists of fragments of glazed and unglazed clay pot in the pink colored. The over plates have been covered with red paint, and some of them with the green glaze. There is a Muslim cemetery not far from the Söyüdlü settlement. The graves were destroyed, and the gravestones were broken. The researches have shown that the place of residence belongs to the 9-15 centuries.

=== Söyüdlü Necropolis ===
Soyudlu Necropolis - the archaeological monument of the Middle Ages in the territory of the Kolany village of the Shahbuz rayon. The gravestones in the Muslim cemetery, were destroyed, and only remained a few of them; consists of ordinary slab stones. There is no any written or images on them. It is supposed that the monument belongs to the 13-15 centuries.

=== Quzey Necropolis ===
Quzey Necropolis - the medieval monument in the territory of the Kolany village of the Shahbuz rayon. A considerable part of the graves were destroyed as a result of the washed by the rainwater. From the direction of the graves, were identified that it is the Muslim cemetery. It is supposed that the monument belongs to the 11-12 centuries.
