= Biçənək =

- Municipality
- Location within Azerbaijan
- Coordinates: 39°30′10″N 45°46′09″E
- Country: Azerbaijan
- Autonomous republic: Nakhchivan
- District: Shahbuz

Population (2005)
  - Total: 1,172
- Time zone: UTC+4 (AZT)

The Stone Bridge, in the east from the Bichanak village (16th-17th centuries)

Biçənək, anglicized as Bichanak and Bichenek, is a village and municipality in the Shahbuz District of Nakhchivan, Azerbaijan. It is located in the near of the Yevlakh-Lachin-Nakhchivan highway, 24 km in the north-east from the district center, on both banks of the Nakhchivanchay river. Its population is busy with gardening and animal husbandry. There are a secondary school, club, library and a medical center in the village. It has a population of 1,172. Nearby in the east is located old Farhad house and the Xınzirək, the place of residence of the Middle Ages.

== Etymology ==
There are different opinions about the meaning of the name of "Bichanak". The present population of the village, explains the meaning of the name of "Bichanak" as "the place which cuts the grass". But all the researchers deny this idea and explains, the origin of the name with the name of an ancient Turkish "Pecenek // Becenek" tribe. Pecenek tribe is one of the Oghuz tribes which Mahmud al-Kashgari mentioned in his work "Dīwānu l-Luġat al-Turk". This is reflected in the work "Secerei-terakime" of the Turkish Sultan Əbulqazi Bahadur Khan. For the first time acad. Ziya Bunyadov wrote that in the "Bichanak" toponym is reflected the name of the ancient Turkish tribe of "Pecenek // Becenek". The word of "Bichanak" as an ancient toponym preserves the name of the "Pecenek // Becenek" tribe.

== History ==
The modern village was founded in the second half of the 19th century as Karmalinovka by Spiritual Christians from Russia, some of whom were Pryguny. In 1919 they abandoned the village, and in 1920 it was renamed to Biçənək, after a medieval village that existed here, and repopulated mostly by Azeris from the neighbouring village of Khynzirak and Zarnatun, later from the Almaly.

Xınzirək (Khynzirak) is a village which existed in the district of the Shahbuz. It was located in the west bank of the Bichanak River. In 1920, its population moved to the Bichanak village. Near to the village there is a place of residence built in the Middle Ages (14th to 17th centuries); the area is 2000 square metres. There are the ruins of houses and the remains of the buildings in the village.

Almalı (Almaly)—according to the administrative-territorial division—was the settlement area of the Shahbuz region of Nakhchivan AR. In accordance of the decision of the Transcaucasian Central Executive Committee dated February 18, 1929, the Almaly village of the district of the Shahbuz, together with other nine villages of Nakhchivan ASSR, with their arable and pasture lands, were illegally annexed to the Armenian SSR. It is claimed to have been a flagrant violation of the terms of the Treaty of Moscow (1921) and the Treaty of Kars (1921) and the norms of international law.

Zərnətün (Zarnatun) is a village which existed in the district of the Shahbuz, in the north-west from the Bichanak village, on the bank of the Zarnatun River. Its population has moved to the Bichanak in 1962.
