= Külüs =

Village and municipality in Nakhchivan, Azerbaijan

- Municipality
- Location within Azerbaijan
- Coordinates: 39°21′43″N 45°39′38″E
- Country: Azerbaijan
- Autonomous republic: Nakhchivan
- District: Shahbuz

Population (2005)
  - Total: 1,179
- Time zone: UTC+4 (AZT)

Külüs (also, Kulus and Kyulyus) is a village and municipality in the Shahbuz District of Nakhchivan, Azerbaijan. It is located in the near of the Shahbuz-Kecili highway, 13 km in the south-east from the district center, on the slope of the Zangezur ridge. Its population is busy with gardening and animal husbandry. There is a secondary school, a club, a library and a medical center in the village. It has a population of 1,179.

== Etymology ==
The meaning of the name of the Kulus is related with the Kol one of the arms of the Sakas and Uz one of the arms of the Kipchaks-Pechenegs-Oghuz which had great migration to the Caucasus in the I Millennium BC. In the 1st-5th centuries the Albanians, in the Middle Ages the Seleykə one of the arms of the Turkic-Kengerli tribe were settled down in this ancient Turkish land and were mixed with the local Turks. Some researchers assumed that the name was created with the word of kuhul (cave).

== History ==
The territory of the Kulus are rich with the ancient and historical places, the monuments, the tombs, and the dozens nekropolis. The village's history begins from the middle Bronze Age. In the places as the Haqqıxlıq, Old Kulus, Dev damy, Əyrək, Shansu olan, Əsgab, Garadagh, Sarıdağ, Kulus Fortress (fully destroyed), has been proved that were living in the past. During the archaeological excavations in Haqqıxlıq were found the bronze daggers, arrowheads, cookware and jewelry of the III-II millennium BC. According to the some sources, the name of the village was registered in the note book which was designed for the collection of the tax in 1590 and the name of Kulus was not altered throughout history. The name of the Garadagh mountain located on the left side of the river flowing through the Kulus village was mentioned at "The Book of Dede Korkut". It is only village in the Shahbuz region that in its territory has five sanctuaries. It is interesting that these sanctuaries are visiting with pre-Islamic traditions. Even now in the Əsghab shrine, the Kaha shrine, the Gara shrine, the Sary shrine and the Xəshdash shrine, villagers are lit candles at the Novruz holiday. There are the trenches of 1918–1920. In that time they were used for the protection from the Armenian aggressors. The population of the village fought against the Armenian armed bands at the group of Gachag Gushdan.

== Historical and archaeological monuments ==
=== Kulus ===
Kulus - the ancient settlement in the south-east of the same named village of the Shahbuz rayon, on the left bank of the Kuluschay River, in the south-east of the high mountain. Its area is 14800 m2. The place of residence was recorded in 1990. In the north-east and south-east side of the settlement surrounded by deep valleys from the all side, kept the remains of the destroyed building. Did not find any signs of the cultural layer. On the monument were found the grain stones, the fragments of the clay pot in the pink and gray colored. The ancient necropolis is registered in the north-western part of the place of residence. At the result of the opened ravine by the tractor, a group of graves has been destroyed. In the destroyed area, were found a pile of ashes, the remains of a human skeleton and the fragments of clay pot in the gray colored. The analysis of collected archaeological materials from the place of residence shows that the monument belongs to the 11-6 centuries BC.

=== Kulus Necropolis ===
Kulus Necropolis - the archaeological monument of the late Bronze and early Iron Age in the north-west of the old settlement, near the Kulus village of the Shahbuz rayon, on the left bank of the Kuluschay River. During the land works the necropolis was destroyed, was found the cultural layer, were found the large and small mountain stones, a pile of gray ash, the parts of the clay pot and the remains of the skeleton. From the discovered stone box graves, were found the bronze dagger, tip of the spear, the bronze bracelets, earrings, rings, agate and paste beads made with artistic design (the jewelry shows the high development of the art of the Bronze Age in the Nakhchivan), the jug, cups, bowls, glasses and mug shaped potteries decorated with ornament. The monument belongs to the end of the 2nd millennium - the beginning of the 1st millennium BC.

=== St. Grigor Church ===
St. Grigor Church was an Armenian church located in the southwestern part of the village. It was founded in the 13th or 14th century and was destroyed at some point between 1997 and 2009.

=== St. Khach Monastery of Agarak ===
St. Khach Monastery was a ruinous Armenian monastery situated on a terrace on the slope of a hill, some 2 km north of the village. The monastery was founded in the 10th or 11th century. In the late Soviet period it was already in ruins and the ruins were completely erased at some point between 1997 and 2009.

== See also ==
- St. Grigor Church (Kulus)
- St. Khach Monastery of Agarak (Kulus)

== Bibliography ==
- Külüs at GEOnet Names Server
