= Arısu =

- Location within Azerbaijan
- Coordinates: 40°29′27″N 45°43′51″E
- Country: Azerbaijan
- Rayon: Gadabay
- Municipality: Əlinağılar
- Time zone: UTC+4 (AZT)
  - Summer (DST): UTC+5 (AZT)

Arısu (also, Arysu and Ayrysu) is a village in the Gadabay Rayon of Azerbaijan. The village forms part of the municipality of Əlinağılar.
