= Sələsüz =

- Municipality
- Location within Azerbaijan
- Coordinates: 39°23′34″N 45°30′14″E
- Country: Azerbaijan
- Autonomous republic: Nakhchivan
- District: Shahbuz

Population
  - Total: 611
- Time zone: UTC+4 (AZT)

Sələsüz (also, Selesyuz) is a village and municipality in the Shahbuz District of Nakhchivan, Azerbaijan. It is located on the left side of the Yevlakh-Lachin-Nakhchivan highway, 7 km west of the district center, on the slope of the Daralayaz ridge. Its population is busy with gardening, farming and animal husbandry. There is a secondary school, library, club and a medical center in the village. It has a population of 611.

== Etymology ==
It took its name from the Sələsüz River. It is the right tributary of the Nakhchivanchay River. The mineral spring Badamly is in the basin of this river. The reason of the creation of the hydronium is the spring of Badamly which passes out from the 25 different places. The name of the river Sələsüz is made up from the components of sələ (a colander made with thin rod in the dialects of the Azerbaijan language) and süz (from the root of the verb of süzmək, "filter"), meaning "filtering from the colander".
