= Veli Bakhshaliyev =

Azerbaijani archaeologist

Vəli Baxşəliyev
- Born: 5 June 1955 (age 71); Böyükdüz, Kangarli
- Scientific career
- Fields: Archaeology
- Workplaces: Nakhchivan Department of Azerbaijan National Academy of Sciences

Veli Bakhshaliyev (Azerbaijani: Baxşəliyev Vəli Baxşəli oğlu; 5 June 1955, Böyükdüz, Kangarli, Nakhchivan district) is an Azerbaijani archaeologist, doctor of historical sciences (2005), professor, and corresponding member of ANAS (2007).

== See also ==
- History of Azerbaijan
