= Tərkeş =

- Municipality
- Location within Azerbaijan Location within Shaki-Zagatala Economic Region
- Coordinates: 40°55′37″N 47°35′35″E
- Country: Azerbaijan
- Rayon: Oghuz

Population
  - Total: 543
- Time zone: UTC+4 (AZT)
  - Summer (DST): UTC+5 (AZT)

Tərkeş (also, Tarkesh and Terkesh) is a village and municipality in the Oghuz Rayon of Azerbaijan. It has a population of 543.
