= Qalakənd =

- Location within Azerbaijan
- Coordinates: 40°29′28″N 45°45′24″E
- Country: Azerbaijan
- Rayon: Gadabay
- Municipality: Plankənd
- Elevation: 1,316 m (4,317 ft)
- Time zone: UTC+4 (AZT)
  - Summer (DST): UTC+5 (AZT)

Qalakənd (also, Kalakend) is a village in the Gadabay Rayon of Azerbaijan. The village forms part of the municipality of Plankənd. The name "Qalakənd" means "castle town", referring to the ruins of the medieval fortress of Parisos located near the village on a bluff overlooking the Shamkir river.
