= Sirab =

- Municipality
- Location within Azerbaijan
- Coordinates: 39°17′26″N 45°30′51″E
- Country: Azerbaijan
- Autonomous republic: Nakhchivan
- District: Babek

Population (2005)
  - Total: 2,730
- Time zone: UTC+4 (AZT)

Sirab (also, Siab and Surab) is a village and municipality in the Babek District of Nakhchivan, Azerbaijan. It is located 14 km in the north-east from the district center, on the foothill area. Its population is busy with grain-growing, vegetable-growing, beekeeping and animal husbandry. There are secondary school, two library, culture house, mosque and a medical center in the village. It has a population of 2,730. The Sirab mineral water deposit is near the village.

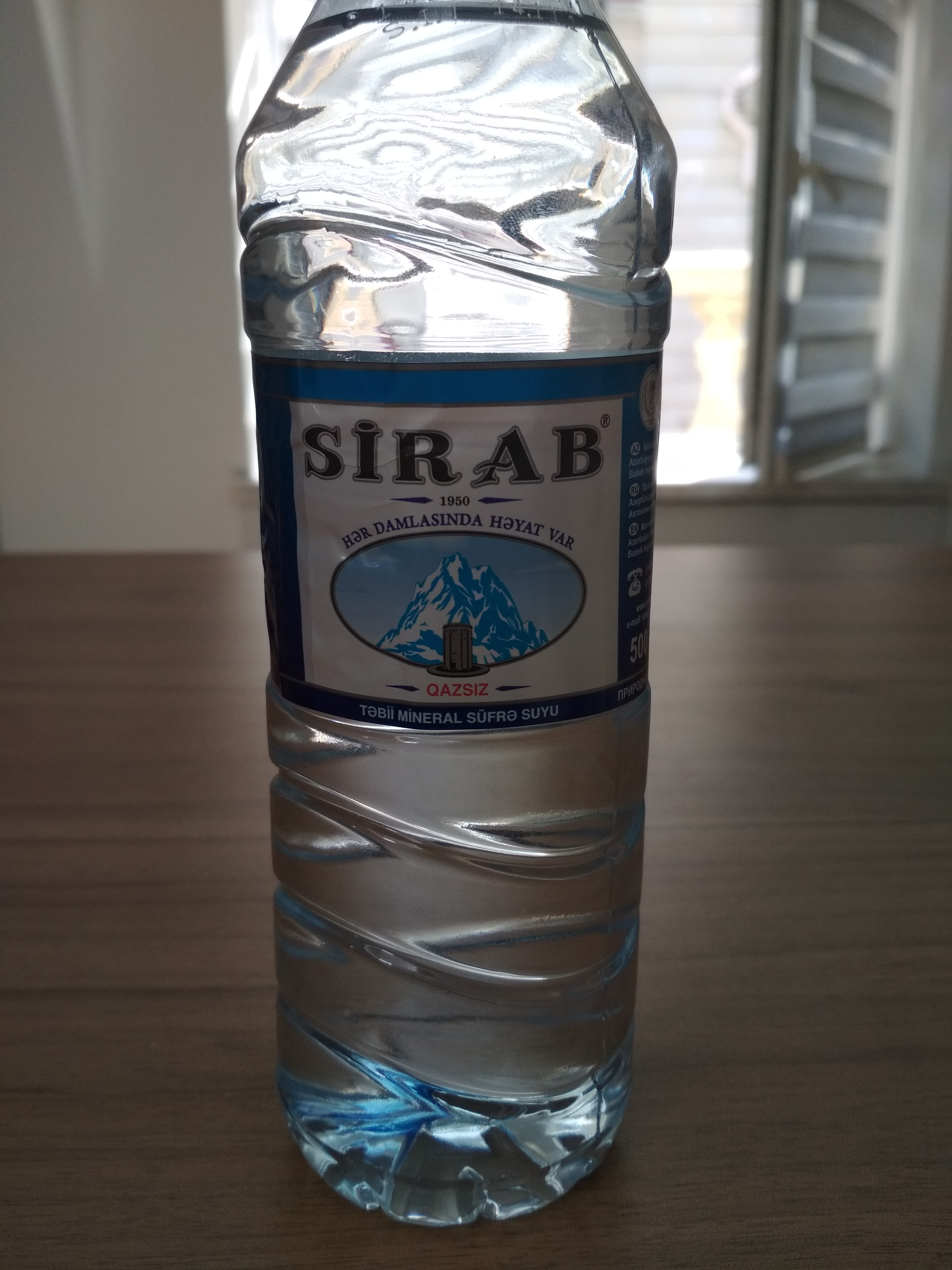
Sirab Azerbaijan natural water

== Etymology ==
In the folk etymology, the toponym means "main water" (Sərab) or "mysterious water" (Sirab). According to the researchers, the name made out of a combination from the Persian words of Sir (rich, saturated) and Ab (water) and means "abundant water, water-saturated". In 1979, near the village was opened for the use, the Sirab Water Reservoir.

== Historical and archaeological monuments ==
=== Dashgala Cave ===
Dashgala Cave - the ancient karst cave in the Sarıdağ Mountain, in the north-west of the Sirab village of Babek rayon. It is also called Sirab cave among the local population. It is believed that the cave is the oldest human settlement.

=== Sirab Necropolis ===
Sirab Necropolis - the archaeological monument of the Middle Ages in the south of the same named village of the Babek rayon. Its area is about 5 hectares. Basically, it consist from rectangle of soil graves oriented towards from the west to east. Most of the head stones of the graves have fallen. Some of the kept head stones consisted of flat stone slabs, upper part of them have been completed in the crown-shaped. Some of the head stones, are found the writing in Arabic-language. There are also inscriptions in Arabic-language on the upper part of the head stones in the ram shaped.
