= Parisos =

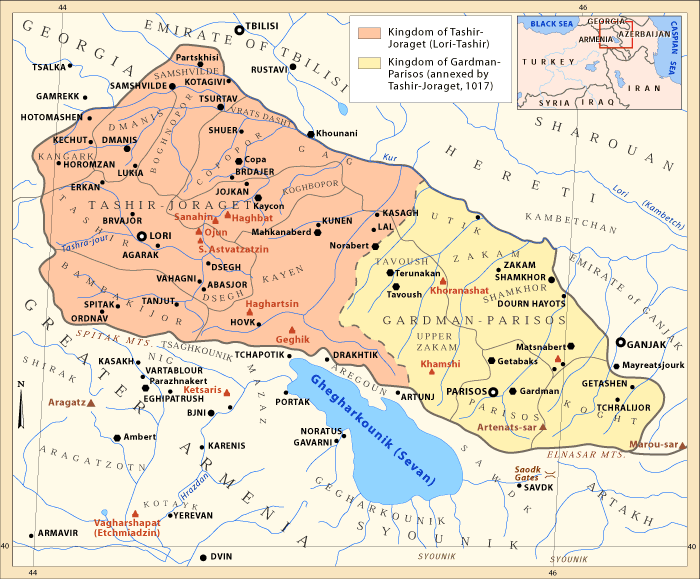
The Kingdom of Gardman-Parisos (yellow) in 1017 when it was acquired by the Kingdom of Lori (red).

P'arisos was a city, fortress, and monastery located in the upper basin of the Shamkir river, near the present-day Azerbaijani village of Qalakənd. The ruins of P'arisos are located on a crag on the left bank of a stream also historically called P'arisos, which is itself a tributary of the Shamkir. P'arisos was also the name of the surrounding district, which comprised the Shamkir basin, and of a kingdom whose capital was here. The kingdom of P'arisos became the most important principality in the eastern Armenian highlands during the 10th century.

The fortress-city of P'arisos was probably founded in the 9th century. It succeeded the nearby fortress Gardman, further downstream on the Shamkir, as the capital of the Shamkir basin. P'arisos was in a somewhat more difficult to access location than Gardman. The name P'arisos is etymologically connected with P'arnēs, which was the name of the district before P'arisos itself was founded. Both names are related to the name of the Iranian tribe called the Parrasioi (Greek: Παρράσιοι) mentioned by Strabo as one of the main groups in the region. The district largely overlapped with the earlier Gardman.

There was also a monastery called P'arisos, which was located somewhere nearby. In one list of Albanian catholicoi, there are two prelates mentioned from the P'arisos monastery, while all the others have only one listed; this implies that the P'arisos monastery had "a high degree of institutionalization", higher than anywhere else in the eastern Armenian regions.

The kingdom of P'arisos originated in the early 10th century with the prince Sahak Sevada, who was the grandson of Atrnerseh and great-grandson of Sahl Smbatean. The rulers of P'arisos appear to have inherited Sahl Smbatean's claim of sovereignty over all of Caucasian Albania. The kingdom of P'arisos came to dominate the highlands around Lake Sevan, the highest part of the Armenian plateau, and its control of several major trade routes made it well-connected with the surrounding Caucasus and Caspian regions. One important route went through the Joroy Get valley, which Sahak Sewaday conquered; this route connected the Kura and Araxes river systems which formed "the main axes" of Georgia and Armenia, respectively. The rulers of P'arisos also controlled the two major passes over the Lesser Caucasus mountains: the P'arisos pass and the Sot'k' pass. The consolidation of power in P'arisos, as well as other small Christian principalities in the region, is related to the relative peace in the region during the early 10th century that led to "rapid development of the economy of Armenia and of the international trade across the South Caucasus".

Sahak Sewaday's grandson, Ishkhanun Sewaday, was called "the great and glorified prince of Albania" by Stephen Orbelian. Ishkhanun Sewaday had four sons: Yovhannes (aka Senek'erim), Grigor, Artnerseh, and Pilippē. First, Senek'erim and Grigor reigned as co-rulers. Around 968, Senek'erim was crowned "king of Albania" and received regalia from both Byzantine and Islamic dignitaries: he received "a mantle and magnificent decorations" from a "Persian king", likely the Sallarid emir of Azerbaijan, and "a crown of rare beauty and royal purple attire" from David III of Tao in his capacity of Byzantine magistros.

Senek'erim's coronation represents "a culminating moment in the history of the ruling house of P'arisos". However, in 1003/4, according to Stepanos Asoghik, both Senek'erim and Grigor died. They may have died during a raid led by Fadl ibn Muhammad, the Shaddadid emir of Arran, who is known to have been active in Sot'k' and Khachen around this time.

According to Stepanos Asoghik, the kingdom of P'arisos was completely destroyed and divided between Fadl and Gagik I of Armenia. However, the kingdom of P'arisos survived and is attested in later sources. It appears that by the time Stepanos had finished his book in 1004/5, he hadn't heard further updates from the eastern regions; meanwhile, Artnerseh and Pilippē survived, perhaps staying in one of the district's many castles, and they appear to have inherited their brothers' joint kingship. They are probably the "Albanian kings Artnerseh and Pipē" mentioned in a letter by the vardapet Tiranun in response to their questions about exegesis, which is preserved in various Armenian manuscripts containing theological works. Tiranun's response, which likely took place not long after the brothers became kings, refers to the two being in "an hour of extreme dangers", perhaps an indication of political upheaval at that time.

The kingdom of P'arisos possibly survived until the middle of the 11th century. It was succeeded in the region by the Principality of Khachen.

== Bibliography ==
- Dorfmann-Lazarev, Igor (2021). "Concerning Four Kings From the Land of 'Deep Ravines, Dense Forests, and Dark Thickets'". In Forness, Philip Michael; Hasse-Ungeheuer, Alexandra; Leppin, Hartmut (eds.). The Good Christian Ruler in the First Millennium: Views from the Wider Mediterranean World in Conversation. Berlin: Walter de Gruyter GmbH. ISBN 9783110724691.
- Hewsen, Robert H. (1992). The Geography of Ananias of Širak: Ašxarhacʻoycʻ, the Long and the Short Recensions. Wiesbaden: Dr. Ludwig Reichert Verlag. ISBN 3-88226-485-3.
