= Tarkesh-e Olya =

Tarkesh-e Olya تركش عليا
- Village
- Location within Iran
- Coordinates: 36°31′27″N 45°15′58″E
- Country: Iran
- Province: West Azerbaijan
- County: Piranshahr
- Bakhsh: Central
- Rural District: Mangur-e Gharbi

Population (2006)
  - Total: 481
- Time zone: UTC+3:30 (IRST)
  - Summer (DST): UTC+4:30 (IRDT)

Tarkesh-e Olya (Persian: تركش عليا, also Romanized as Tarkesh-e ‘Olyā; also known as Tīrkesh-e Bālā) is a village in Mangur-e Gharbi Rural District, in the Central District of Piranshahr County, West Azerbaijan Province, Iran. At the 2006 census, its population was 481, in 72 families.
