= Qızıl Qışlaq, Fuzuli =

Qızıl Qışlaq
- Interactive map of Qızıl Qışlaq
- Country: Azerbaijan
- District: Fuzuli
- Time zone: UTC+4 (AZT)
  - Summer (DST): UTC+5 (AZT)

Qızıl Qışlaq (Gyzyl Gyshlag) is a village in the Fuzuli District of Azerbaijan.
