= Türkeş =

- Municipality
- Location within Azerbaijan
- Coordinates: 39°25′21″N 45°28′27″E
- Country: Azerbaijan
- Autonomous republic: Nakhchivan
- District: Shahbuz

Population (2005)
  - Total: 407
- Time zone: UTC+4 (AZT)

Türkeş (also, Tyurkesh, Terkeş, Tərkesh; Tırkeş, Tyrkesh until 2003) or Taterk (Armenian: Թաթերք, romanized: T'at'erk') is a village and municipality in the Shahbuz District of Nakhchivan, Azerbaijan. It is located 13 km in the south-west from the district center, on the foothill area. Its population is busy with farming and animal husbandry.

There are a secondary school, a library, a club and a medical center in the village. It has a population of 407. Türkeş is located on a foothill, in the junction of the Nakhchivanchay River and its tributary of Selesuz River.

== Etymology ==
The original name is the Tirkeş. Since 2003, the name of the village registered officially as Türkeş.

In the "Dīwānu l-Luġat al-Turk" work of the Mahmud al-Kashgari shown the word of the Tirkesh on the meaning "the place junction of two rivers". The geographical objects associated with the name of the ancient Turkic Türgesh tribe and the eponymous khaganate, almost all of them are located at the junction of two rivers or between two rivers.

== History ==
According to Armenian sources—dating back to 1784—the former Armenian village of Taterk (Թաթերք) was located in the Yernjak province of the historical Syunik province of Greater Armenia. About 5-5.5 km to the north-west of this village was a sizeable medieval village. The area of that old village included 70-75 other residential buildings. At present, Taterk is in ruins.

An Apostolic church was built in the middle of the village; it was destroyed in the 20th century. A mosque was built in the village soon after, possibly also in the 20th century.

== Türkeş Necropolis ==
The Türkeş Necropolis is the archaeological monument of the Middle Ages in the village of the Turkesh in the Shahbuz District. Most of the chest and head tombstones were broken. Two of the three the ram's figure are in simple form, but on the one side of the third one was scratched curved lines with the method of scratching. During the archaeological excavations, the dagger which was found from the cultural layer shows that the monument belongs to the 15th-16th centuries.
