= Yuxarı Qışlaq =

- Municipality
- Location within Azerbaijan
- Coordinates: 39°30′00″N 45°41′36″E
- Country: Azerbaijan
- Autonomous republic: Nakhchivan
- District: Shahbuz

Population (2005)
  - Total: 535
- Time zone: UTC+4 (AZT)

View from Yuxarı Qışlaq

Yuxarı Qışlaq (also, Yukhary Gyshlag, Maghara-Gyshlag and Ismayil Gyshlag) is a village and municipality in the Shahbuz District of Nakhchivan, Azerbaijan. It is located 17 km in the north-east from the district center, on the bank of the Yukhary Gyshlag River (tributary of Nakhchivanchay River). Its population is busy with gardening and animal husbandry. There are secondary school, club, library and a medical center in the village. It has a population of 535. Nearby, registered the Kelekli II settlement of the Middle Ages.

== Etymology ==
Yuxarı Qışlaq is located on the slope of the Zangezur ridge. According to researchers, the second component of the name of Yukhary Gyshlag, can not be taken to mean as "wintering". Because the area which the villages of the Yukhary (Upper) Gyshlag and Ashaghy (Lower) Gyshlag are located is not suitable for the wintering. The name is associated with the name of one of the arms of the Gyzyl Gyshlag tribe (orta gyshlag, gullu gyshlag, yazly gyshlag, yazy gyshlag or duz gyshlag) of the Turkic Kengerli. The name of Yukhary Gyshlag as ethno toponym means "as the upper part of the territory, inhabited by the tribe of the gyshlag".

== Kelekli II ==
Kələkli II is the settlement of the Middle Ages in the Shahbuz rayon, between the villages of Aşağı Qışlaq and Yuxarı Qışlaq. It was recorded in 1990. Its area is 41500 m2. It is located at the slope of the mountain which is surrounded by the deep valleys from all sides. The main part of the settlement was plowed by the tractor and being used as an arable land. The surface materials, mostly, consists from the fragments of cooked clay pot in gray and pink colored (pot, jar, cup, little pot-type containers, etc.). Near the place of residence, there are sanctuary, as well as the place of the temple (now completely destroyed). It is supposed that the place of residence belongs to the 8-13 centuries.
