= Ağbulaq, Nakhchivan =

Village and municipality in Nakhchivan, Azerbaijan

Ağbulaq
- Municipality
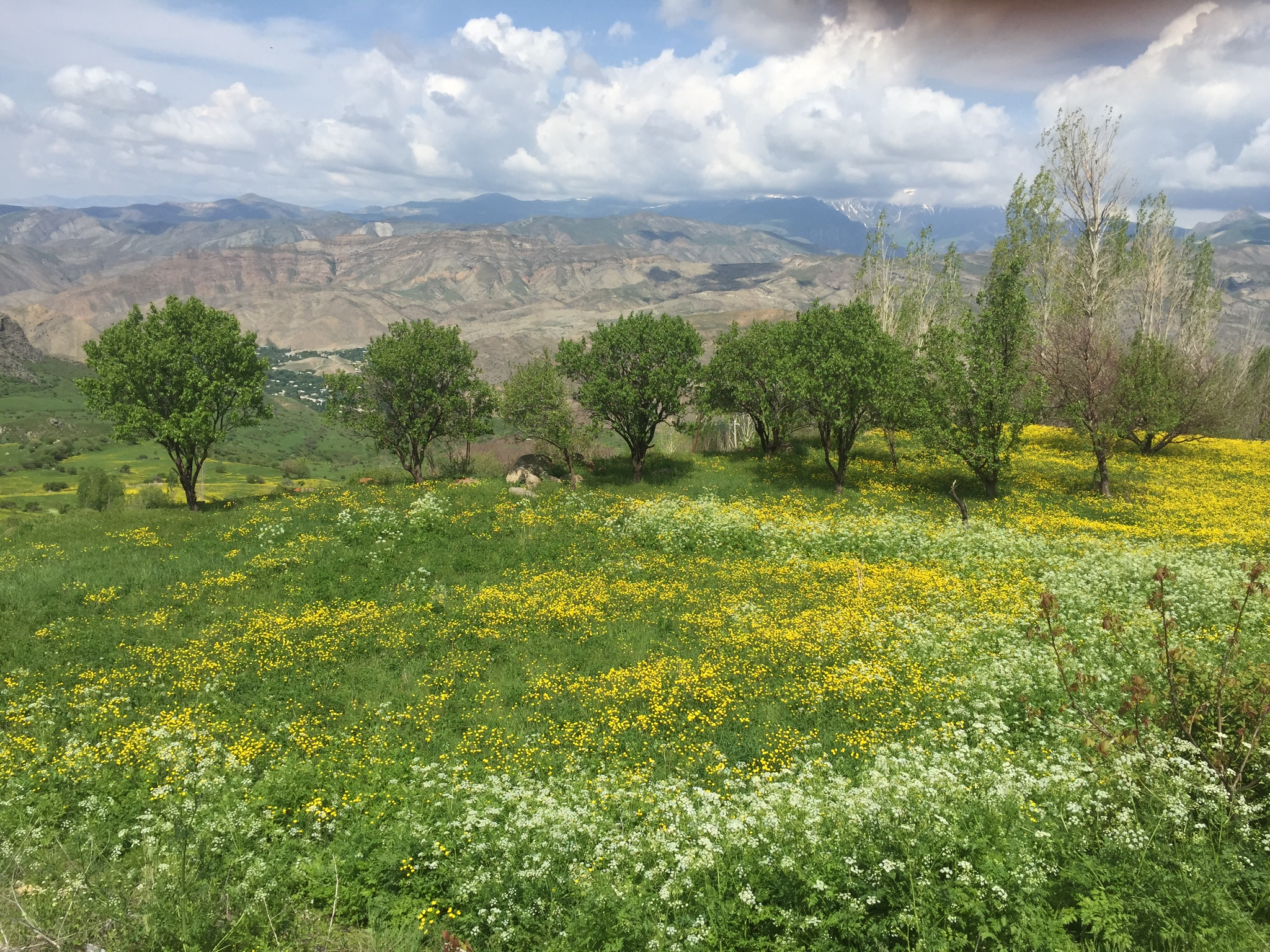

- Location within Azerbaijan
- Coordinates: 39°26′50″N 45°43′21″E
- Country: Azerbaijan
- Autonomous republic: Nakhchivan
- District: Shahbuz

Population (2005)
  - Total: 445
- Time zone: UTC+4 (AZT)

Ağbulaq (also as Aghbulag, Akbulak; until 2003, Geçəzur, Gecəzur, Gedzhazur, and Gidzhadzur) is a village and municipality in the Shahbuz District of Nakhchivan, Azerbaijan. It is located 16 km in the north-east from the district center. The People of the village are typically busy with animal husbandry. There are secondary schools, clubs, a library, medical center and a Ski Resort in the village. It has a population of 445.

== Etymology ==
The name of the village is associated with name of the Ağbulaq (White spring) spring in its territory. Its previous name was Gecəzur. According to researchers, the name of the village made out of the words of gecə (dark) and Persian word of zur (valley) means, "dark valley". Since 2003, the name of the village has officially been registered as Ağbulaq.

== History ==
Till the end of the 80s, Armenians were lived in the Ağbulaq village beside Azerbaijanis. In the beginning of the Nagorno-Karabakh conflict, 250 thousand Azerbaijanis who lived in the territory of Armenia were all deported to Azerbaijan and all of them took shelter in the different territories of Azerbaijan, including in the village of Ağbulaq, at the same time Armenians who lived in the Ağbulaq, were deported to the Armenia.

According to the results of the population census cameral, launched in April 1829 and ended in May 1832 by the leadership Ivan Ivanovich Chopin's, in the Gecəzur village of the Nakhchivan district of the Nakhchivan province of the Armenian Oblast (On March 16, 1828, according to the fifteenth paragraph of the Treaty of Turkmenchay, concluded on February 10, 1828, the Armenians deported from Qajar Empire to the Azerbaijan) at 13 houses were lived 54 Armenians (30 men, 24 women) resettled to here from Iran.

== Monuments ==
St. Astvatsatsin Church was an Armenian church located in the central part of the village. The church was founded in the 12th or 13th and was destroyed at some point between 1997 and 2009.

== See also ==
- St. Astvatsatsin Church (Aghbulag)
