= Mahmudoba, Khachmaz =

Mahmudoba
- Location within Azerbaijan
- Coordinates: 41°25′12″N 48°48′18″E
- Country: Azerbaijan
- District: Khachmaz
- Time zone: UTC+4 (AZT)
  - Summer (DST): UTC+5 (AZT)

Mahmudoba is a village in the Khachmaz District of Azerbaijan.
