= Aşağı Qışlaq =

- Municipality
- Location within Azerbaijan
- Coordinates: 39°28′10″N 45°42′07″E
- Country: Azerbaijan
- Autonomous republic: Nakhchivan
- District: Shahbuz

Government
  - Title: Shabuz

Area
  - Total: 50,000,309 km^{2} (19,305,227 sq mi)

Population (2005)
  - Total: 917
- Time zone: UTC+4 (AZT)

Aşağı Qışlaq (also Ashagy Gyshlag and Alimammad-Gyshlag ) is a village and municipality in the Shahbuz District of Nakhchivan, Azerbaijan. It is located one kilometer from the Yevlakh-Lachin-Nakhchivan highway and twelve kilometers north-east of the district center. The main sectors of industry for the village include gardening and animal husbandry. There is a secondary school, a library, a communications branch, a club, and a medical center in the village. It has a population of 917.

== Etymology ==
Aşağı Qışlaq (Ashaghy Gyshlag) is the foothill area. While the second component of the name of Ashaghy Gyshlag technically translates to "wintering", the translation should not be taken literally, as the villages of the Yukhary (Upper) Gyshlag and Ashaghy (Lower) Gyshlag are not suitable for wintering. The name is associated with the name of one of the arms of the Gyzyl Gyshlag tribe (Orta Gyshlag, Gullu Gyshlag, Yazly Gyshlag, Yazy Gyshlag or Duz Gyshlag) of the Turkic Kengerli. The name of Ashaghy Gyshlag as an ethno toponym means "the lower part of the territory", and it is inhabited by the tribe of the gyshlag.
