= Nursu =

Village and municipality in Nakhchivan, Azerbaijan

- Municipality
- Location within Azerbaijan
- Coordinates: 39°24′09″N 45°40′13″E
- Country: Azerbaijan
- Autonomous republic: Nakhchivan
- District: Shahbuz

Population (2005)
  - Total: 812
- Time zone: UTC+4 (AZT)

Nursu (also, Nurs and Nur-su) is a village and municipality in the Shahbuz District of Nakhchivan, Azerbaijan. It is located 8 km in the north-east from the district center, on the foothill area. Its population is busy with gardening and animal husbandry. There is a secondary school, a library, a club and a medical center in the village. It has a population of 812.

== Etymology ==
The name of the village is related to the name of the same named river in its area. And the name of the Nursu river means "the water which flowing water from the steep rock".

== Historical and archaeological monuments ==
=== Nursu Necropolis ===
Nursu Necropolis - the archaeological monument of the last medieval in the village of Nursu of the Shahbuz district. It is located on the top of the tall hill. It is the Muslim cemetery. According to the local people, there have been about 10 tombstones figures of a ram in the cemetery, the majority were destroyed, while others were transported. It is supposed that the monument belongs to the 15–16 centuries.

=== St. Yerrordutyun Church ===
St. Yerrordutyun Church was an Armenian church located in the western part of the village. It was founded in the 13th or 14th century and was destroyed at some point between 1997 and 2009.

== See also ==
- St. Yerrordutyun Church (Nursu)
