= Daylaqlı =

- Municipality
- Location within Azerbaijan
- Coordinates: 39°23′42″N 45°32′05″E
- Country: Azerbaijan
- Autonomous republic: Nakhchivan
- District: Shahbuz

Population (2005)
  - Total: 391
- Time zone: UTC+4 (AZT)

Daylaqlı (also, Daylagly, until 2003, Əzızbəyov and Azizbekov) is a village and municipality in the Shahbuz District of Nakhchivan, Azerbaijan. It is located near the Yevlakh-Lachin-Nakhchivan highway, 4 km from the district center, on the bank of the Nakhchivanchay River. Its population is busy with farming and animal husbandry. There is a secondary school, club, library and a medical center in the village. It has a population of 391.
