= Kükü =

Village in Nakhchivan, Azerbaijan

- Municipality
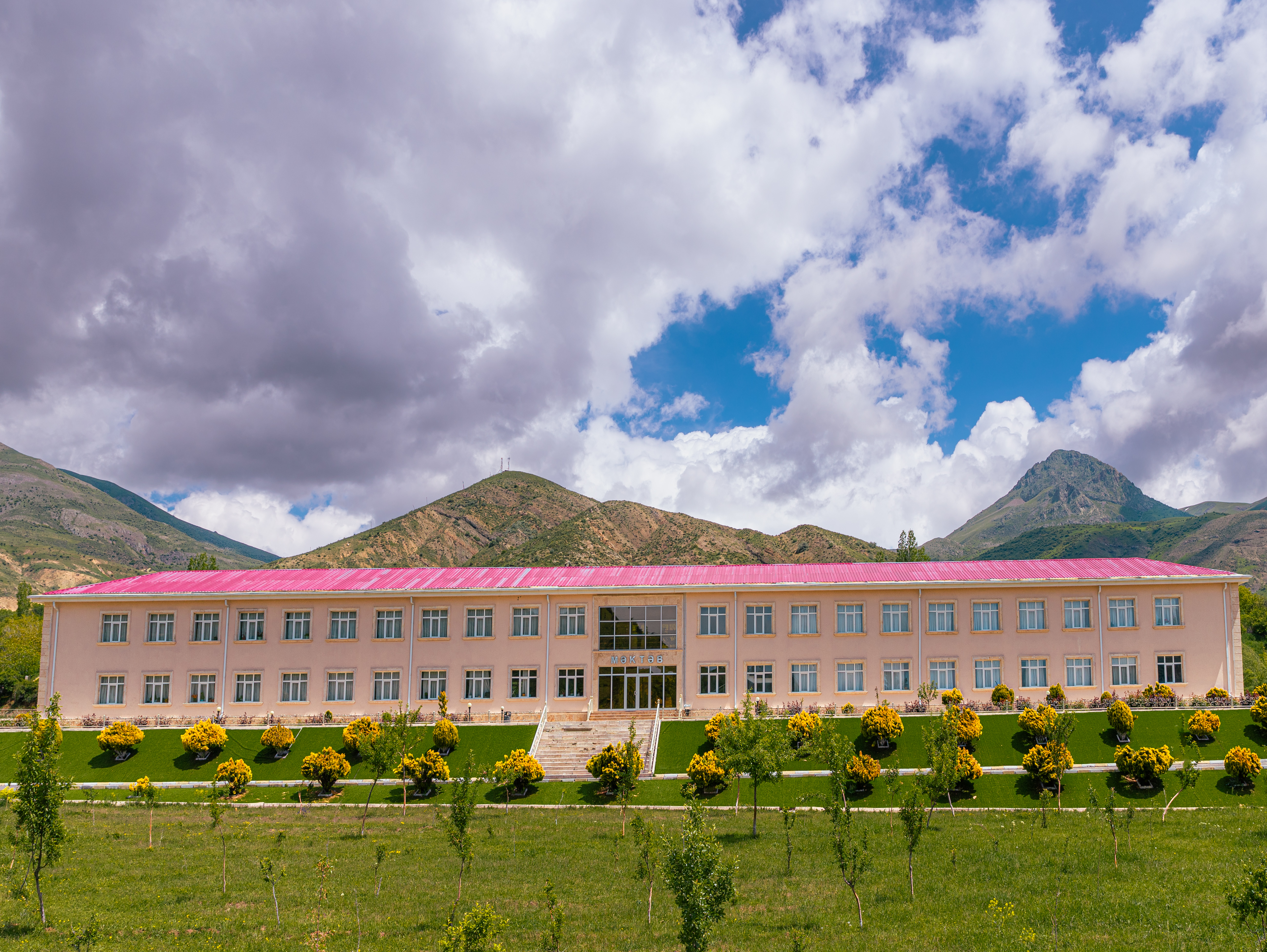
- Kükü village secondary school.

- Location within Azerbaijan
- Coordinates: 39°31′24″N 45°37′21″E
- Country: Azerbaijan
- Autonomous republic: Nakhchivan
- District: Shahbuz

Population (2005)
  - Total: 1,466
- Time zone: UTC+4 (AZT)

Kükü (also, Kuku, Kyuki and Kyukyu) is a village and municipality in the Shahbuz District of Nakhchivan, Azerbaijan. It is located 20 km in the north from the district center, on the bank of the Kukuchay River, on the south-west of the slope of the Daralayaz ridge. Its population is busy with gardening and animal husbandry.

There are a secondary school, a kindergarten, a library, a club and a hospital in the village. It has a population of 1,466. Nearby are located the archaeological monuments of Kuku I, Kuku II and Kuku Necropolis.

== Etymology ==
The name of the Kükü village is associated with the same named river which is flowing through the area. The name of the Küküçay (Kukuchay River) made out from the components of the Turkic words of kükü (blue water) and çay (river), means "the Blue water River".

As it is located near the border with Armenia, it has also been referred to in Armenian literature by the name Konk (Armenian: Կոնք, romanized: Konk').

== Historical and archaeological monuments ==
=== Kuku I ===
Kuku I - the ancient settlement at the entrance of the same named village of the Shahbuz district, on the right bank of Kukuchay River. It has covered of the two tall hills and its slope. The area is more than 74 hectares. The exploration works shows that the cultural layer has been destroyed. In accordance the relief of the mountain, the buildings are located in the narrow sidewalks. The pink and gray clay jug, bowl fragments were found from the place of residence. It is believed that there are the ancient graves in the area. The collected ground surface materials from the place of the residence, is considered to belong to the II-I millennium BC.

=== Kuku II ===
Kuku II - the archaeological monument of the first Iron Age in the district of the Shahbuz, is located in slightly below from the junction of the rivers Kukuchay and Zyrnel. It is located on the bank of the Kukuchay River, on the top of the tall hill and is surrounded on all sides by deep canyons. Its area is 6400 m2. The ruins of a building which built with large stones were found in the settlement. According to the preserved remains of rooms, can say that, they have been in quadrangular shape. The saved wall remains are consist of a row of large stones. In the south-west side, were found the ruins of the stone wall in two rows. Sometimes adjacent and sometimes located far from each other rooms, are large and the area is up to 35 m2. Pink pottery fragments have been found from the place of residence and tambourine stone have been found in the right bank of the Kukuchay River. It is assumed that the monument belongs to the end of the 2nd millennium BC and the beginning of the 1st millennium BC.

=== Kuku Necropolis ===
Kuku Necropolis - the archaeological monument of the Bronze Age in the inside of the same named village in the Shahbuz district. During the construction was determined that the monument are the ancient tombs. At the result of the research, from the first grave was found a large monochrome painted jug and gray plates. In some places, has been found a thin layer of ash, while more depth were the large stones. According to the finding materials, the grave of the depth of 3 m (length 2.5 m), width of the part of the survived portion was 0.6 m. The second grave was completely destroyed. The length of the surviving portion is the 4 m, a width of 0.6 m. The animal bones were dispersed throughout the grave. Bronze spear tip and bronze pins were found from grave. From the analysis of samples of the material culture of the Kuku necropolis, it is assumed that the monument belongs to the end of the 3rd millennium BC – the beginning of the 2nd millennium BC.

=== St. Nshan Monastery ===
St. Nshan or Hazarabyurats Monastery was a ruinous Christian monastery located on the slope of a hill, approximately 700m north of the village. It was founded in the middle of the 13th century by Armenians and was completely erased between 2003 and 2009.

== See also ==
St. Nshan Monastery (Kuku)
