= Güney Qışlaq =

- Municipality
- Location within Azerbaijan
- Coordinates: 39°30′47″N 45°34′52″E
- Country: Azerbaijan
- Autonomous republic: Nakhchivan
- District: Shahbuz

Population (2005)
  - Total: 555
- Time zone: UTC+4 (AZT)

Güney Qışlaq (also, Guney Gyshlag, Guney Gishlak, until 2003, Yuxarı Remeşin, Yukhari-Rameshin, Yukhary Remeshin and Yukhary Iremeshin) is a village and municipality in the Shahbuz District of Nakhchivan, Azerbaijan. It is located 17 km in the north from the district center, on the bank of the Kyukyuchay River (tributary of Nakhchivanchay River). Its population is busy with gardening and animal husbandry. There are secondary school, library, club and a medical center in the village. It has a population of 555. Nearby registered the place of residence of the early medieval, Yarnıx, Dalma, Kelekli I.

== Etymology ==
Its previous name was Rəməşin. In the first half of the 19th century, the new founded settlement was named as Aşağı (Lower) Remeşin, and the old village was named as Yuxarı (Upper) Remeşin. The name of Rəməşin made out from the word of irəmə (the rough land, uneven place) in dialects of Azerbaijani language and şin/şen (place of residence, village) means "the village in the uneven place". Since 2003, the name of the village has officially been registered as Güney Qışlaq. The current name of the place is related to the Gyzyl Gyshlag tribe, one of the arms of the Turkic Kengerli tribe.

== Historical and archaeological monuments ==
=== Yarnıx (Yarnikh) ===
Yarnıx (Yarnikh) - the place of residence of the 5-8 centuries, nearby the Güney Qışlaq village of the Shahbuz rayon. Its area is 625 m2. It is on the high and elongated hill. On the south-west side of the monument were observed the remains of the building, the place of four-cornered room. As a result of archeological exploration works, were collected the fragments of clay pot in the pink colored. There is a necropolis nearby the Yarnıx settlement area, on the slope of the hill in the horseshoe-shaped.

=== Dəlmə (Dalma) ===
Dəlmə (Dalma) - the place of residence in the north-west from Güney Qışlaq village of the Shahbuz rayon. The archaeological monument far away from the place of residence of the Yarnıx, on the slope of high hill. Its area is 2500 m2. The remains of the building were bad stored, the buildings destroyed and its stones scattered to the around. Necropolis is located near the place of residence. On the graves are found the intact slab stone. It is supposed that the place of residence belongs to the 5-7 centuries.

=== Kələkli I (Kelekli I) ===
Kələkli I (Kelekli I) - the settlement of the Middle Ages, near the Güney Qışlaq village of the Shahbuz rayon, in the valley. It was recorded in 1990. Its area is 1250 m2. It is located on the slope of high hill. It bordered by the plain area from the south-east side, and by the little mountain river from the north-east. The buildings, mostly made of stone has been severely damaged. During the archaeological researches, were found the fragments of the clay pot in the pink colored and pottery. Nearby, there is a necropolis on the other side of the river. The place of residence belongs to the 5-8 centuries.
