= Şahbuz =

- City & Municipality
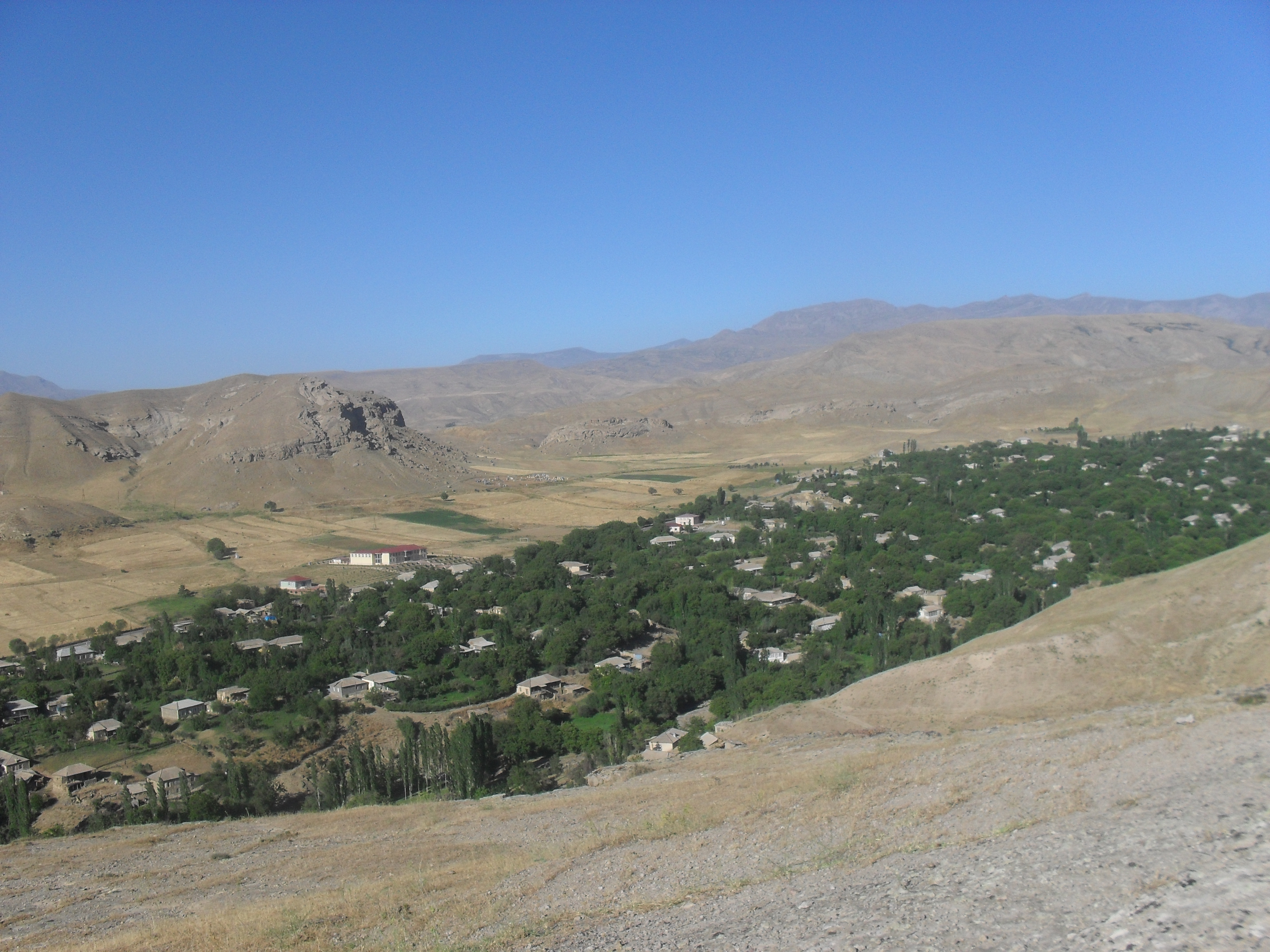

- Location within Azerbaijan
- Coordinates: 39°24′26″N 45°34′26″E
- Country: Azerbaijan
- Autonomous republic: Nakhchivan
- District: Shahbuz

Population (2008)
  - Total: 3,127
- Time zone: UTC+4 (AZT)

Şahbuz (Shahbuz) is a city and municipality in and capital of Shahbuz District, in the Nakhchivan Autonomous Republic of Azerbaijan. It has a population of 3,127.

== Climate ==
Climate data for Şahbuz(normals for 1939-1991)
Month	Jan	Feb	Mar	Apr	May	Jun	Jul	Aug	Sep	Oct	Nov	Dec	Year
Average precipitation mm (inches)	27.8 (1.09)	29.6 (1.17)	45.0 (1.77)	54.8 (2.16)	52.4 (2.06)	33.9 (1.33)	14.3 (0.56)	9.4 (0.37)	11.9 (0.47)	30.2 (1.19)	32.9 (1.30)	32.3 (1.27)	374.5 (14.74)
Source: NCEI
