= Qızıl Qışlaq, Shahbuz =

Qızıl Qışlaq
- Municipality
- Location within Azerbaijan
- Coordinates: 39°28′43″N 45°35′51″E
- Country: Azerbaijan
- Autonomous republic: Nakhchivan
- District: Shahbuz

Population (2005)
  - Total: 716
- Time zone: UTC+4 (AZT)

Qızıl Qışlaq (also, Gyzyl Gyshlag; until 2003, Aşağı Remeşin, Aşağı Rəməşin, Ashaghy Rameshin, and Ashaghy Remeshin) is a village and municipality in the Shahbuz District of Nakhchivan, Azerbaijan. It is located in the near of the Shahbuz-Kuku highway, 14 km in the north from the district center, on the bank of the Kukuchay River. Its population is busy with gardening and animal husbandry. There are secondary school, kindergarten, library, club and a medical center in the village. It has a population of 716. Nearby, on the top of the tall hill have been recorded the Sarıdərə necropolis of the 3-1 millennium BC, as well as the ancient settlements of the Qızıl Qışlaq and Sarıdərə.

== Etymology ==
The original version of the distorted toponym is the "Aşağı Rəməşin". This settlement was founded by the families from the former Rəməşin (now Guney Gyshlag). In 1969, the village Zırnel nearby has jointed to this village. In the Azerbaijan people's language, for the geographic term uses as the rəməl / irəmə ("little hill, rugged place"); şin / şın ("house, place with many other people"; "crowded, plenty"). In this regard, the word "Remeshin" can be explained as "the place located on the low hill, bumpy place, the village". Since 2003, the name of the village has officially been registered as Qızıl Qışlaq. The current name of the village is from the nearby ancient settlement of Qızıl Qışlaq. The name of the place is related to the Gyzyl Gyshlag tribe, one of the arms of the Turkic Kengerli tribe.

== Qızıl Qışlaq ==
Qızıl Qışlaq is the settlement of the medieval ages in the near of the village of the Qızıl Qışlaq, in the Shahbuz district, on the right bank of the Kukuchay. It was recorded in 1986. The area is 525 m2. It is limited from the south-western side by the Guruchay valley. A part of the settlement was destroyed during road building and were discovered the building remains. The length of the wall thickness is 3 m, and its width is 1 m. The surface materials consist mostly of pink clay products and fragments of glazed pots. Nearby were found the grape-crushed stones. According to the findings, the settlement likely existed from the first centuries of the millennium up to the 13th through 15th centuries.

== Sarıdərə ==
Sarıdərə is the settlement of the Bronze Age near the village of Qızıl Qışlaq in the Shahbuz district, on the right bank of the Kukuchay River. It is bordered with deep valleys on either side. The monument in oval plan is consist from the two terraces. The area is 1500 m2. Here has been found the remains of building. Surface materials consist of pink and gray clay products (jug, bowl, cover broken). On the slope of the hill were found the gray and black colored stones made from the tuff which been used by the ancient people to grind all kind of seeds. Analysis of the findings showed that the residence of Saridere belongs to the 3-1 millennium BC.

== Zərnel ==
Zərnel (Zarnel and Zyrnel) - the existed village in the Shahbuz rayon. It was located at the foot of the Zirnel mountain, on the bank of the Kukuchay River. In 1969, in connection of the landslide, its population was moved to the village of Gyzyl Gyshlag.
