= Badamlı =

Village and municipality in the Shahbuz District of Nakhchivan, Azerbaijan

- Municipality
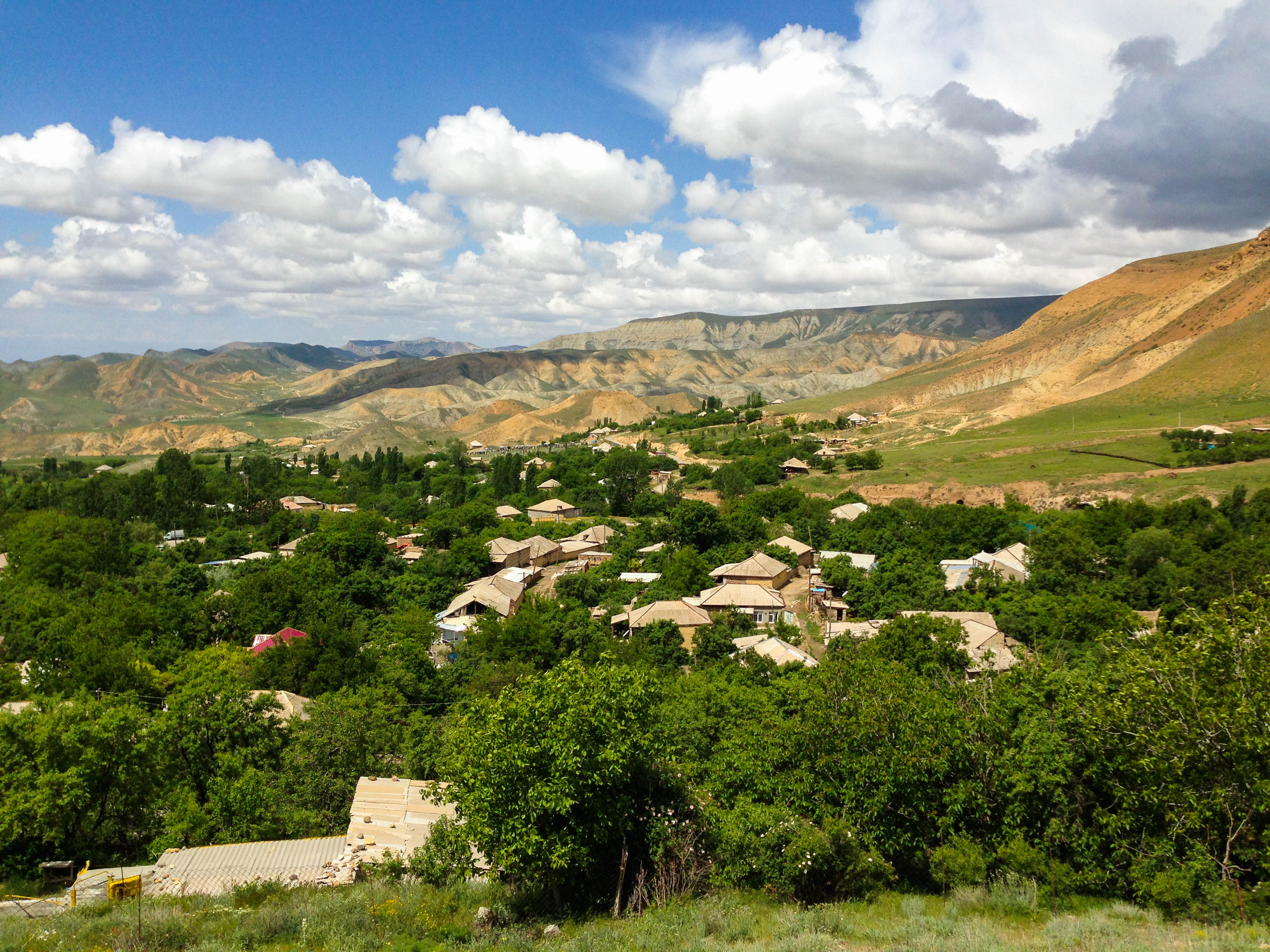

- Location within Azerbaijan
- Coordinates: 39°27′00″N 45°31′46″E
- Country: Azerbaijan
- Autonomous republic: Nakhchivan
- District: Shahbuz

Population (2005)
  - Total: 1,101
- Time zone: UTC+4 (AZT)

Badamlı (also, Badamly) is a village and municipality in the Shahbuz District of Nakhchivan, Azerbaijan. It is located 14 km in the west from the district center. Its population is busy with gardening and animal husbandry. There are secondary school, culture house, library and hospital in the village. It has a population of 1,101. There were the ram stone sculptures of the Middle Ages in the cemetery of its territory.

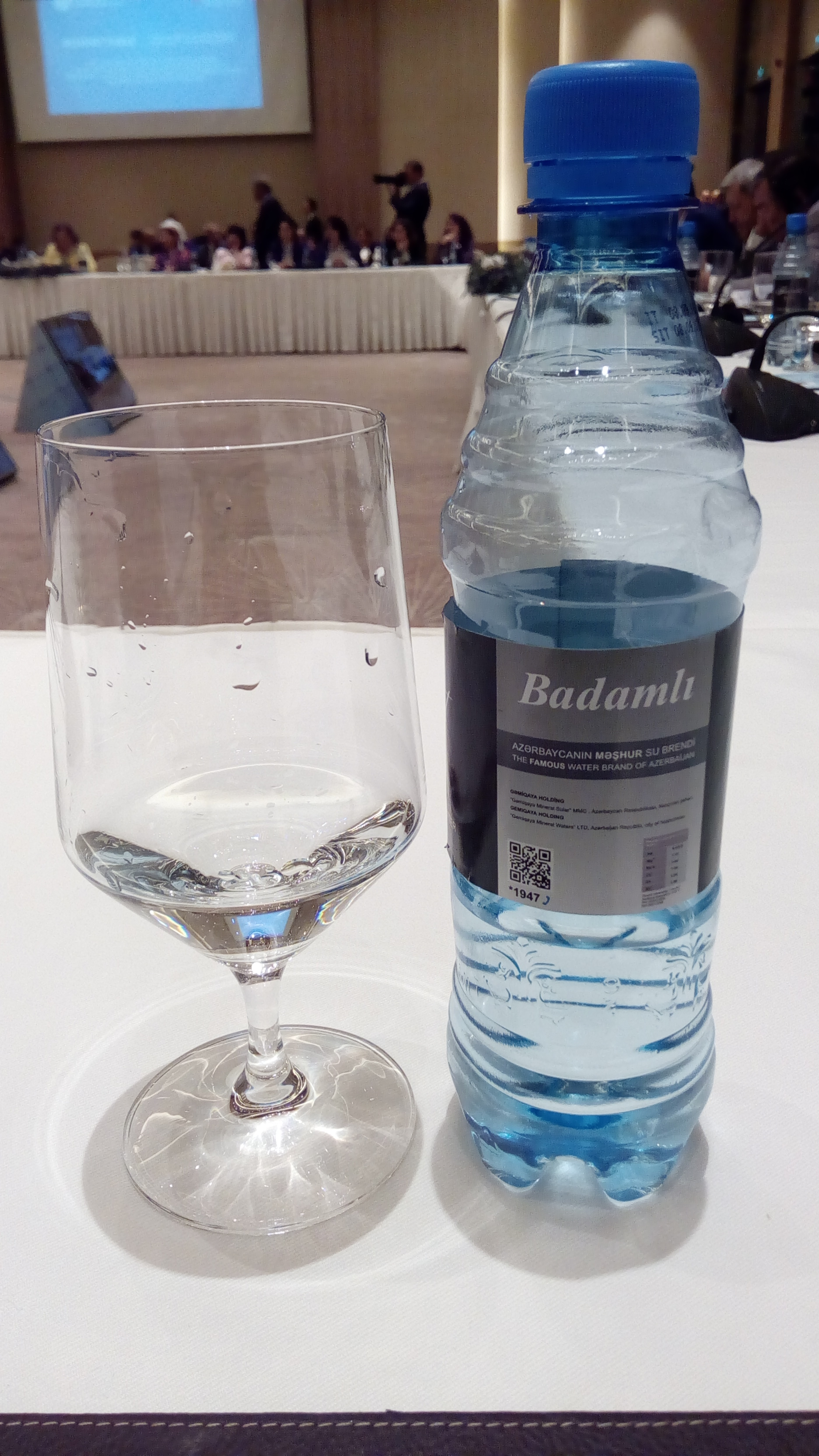
Produced local water Badamlı for "Fairmont Baku"

== Etymology ==
It is located in the southern slope of the ridge of the Daralayaz. The name of the village means "The village which has almond trees in its territory". The settlement was found in the area named Badamlı (Almonds) which indeed was the rich with wild almond trees.

== Historical and archaeological monuments ==
=== Badamlı Necropolis ===
Badamlı Necropolis - the archaeological monument of the Middle Ages in the same named village of the Shahbuz rayon. Its area is 0.25 hectares; it consists of a Muslim cemetery. The head and chest stones of the graves are destroyed; written deceased's date of death on one of the graves. It is supposed that it belongs to the 15-16 centuries.

== Monasteries and Churches ==
St. Astvatsatsin Monastery was an Armenian monastery located 600-700m east of the village. It was founded in the 12th or 13th century and was destroyed at some point between 1997 and July 28, 2008.

Zham Church was an Armenian church located in the southeastern part of the village. It was founded in 1195 and was destroyed at some point between 1997 and 2009.

== See also ==
- St. Astvatsatsin Monastery (Badamly)
- Zham Church (Badamly)
