= Böyükdüz, Kangarli =

Böyükdüz
- Municipality
- Location within Azerbaijan
- Coordinates: 39°16′50″N 45°14′08″E
- Country: Azerbaijan
- Autonomous republic: Nakhchivan
- District: Kangarli

Population
  - Total: 1,435
- Time zone: UTC+4 (AZT)

Böyükdüz (also, Böyük Düz and Bëyuk-Dyuz) is a village and municipality in the Kangarli District of Nakhchivan, Azerbaijan. It has a population of 1,435.
