= Shahbuz District =

District of Nakhchivan Autonomous Republic in Azerbaijan

Coordinates: 39°29′N 45°40′E

- District
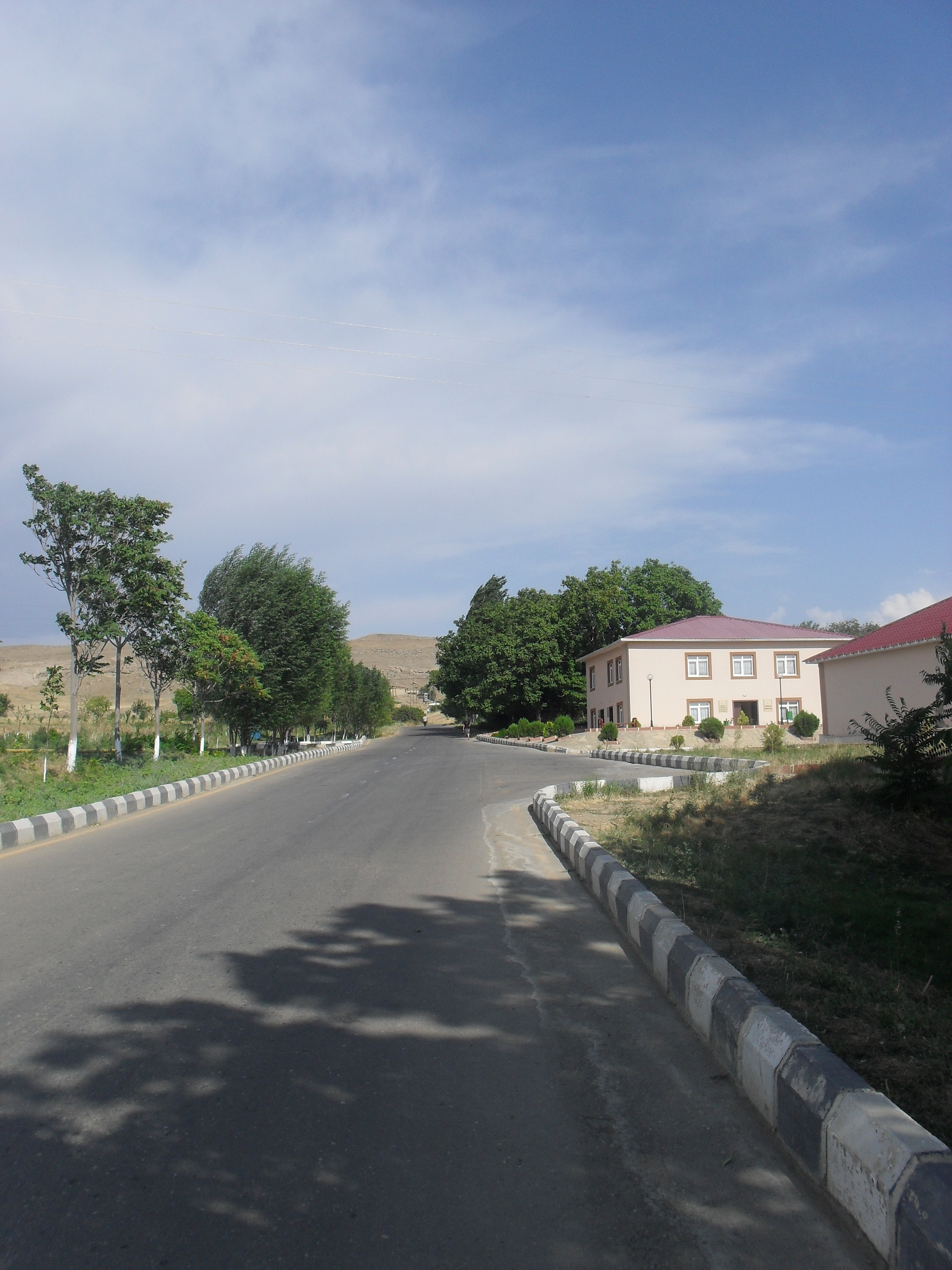

- Map of Azerbaijan showing Shahbuz District
- Country: Azerbaijan
- Autonomous Republic: Nakhchivan
- Established: 8 August 1930
- Capital: Shahbuz
- Settlements: 26

Government
  - Governor: Rafail Babayev

Area
  - Total: 840 km^{2} (320 sq mi)

Population (2020)
  - Total: 25,300
  - Density: 30/km^{2} (78/sq mi)
- Time zone: UTC+4 (AZT)
- Postal code: 7100
- Website: sahbuz-ih.nakhchivan.az

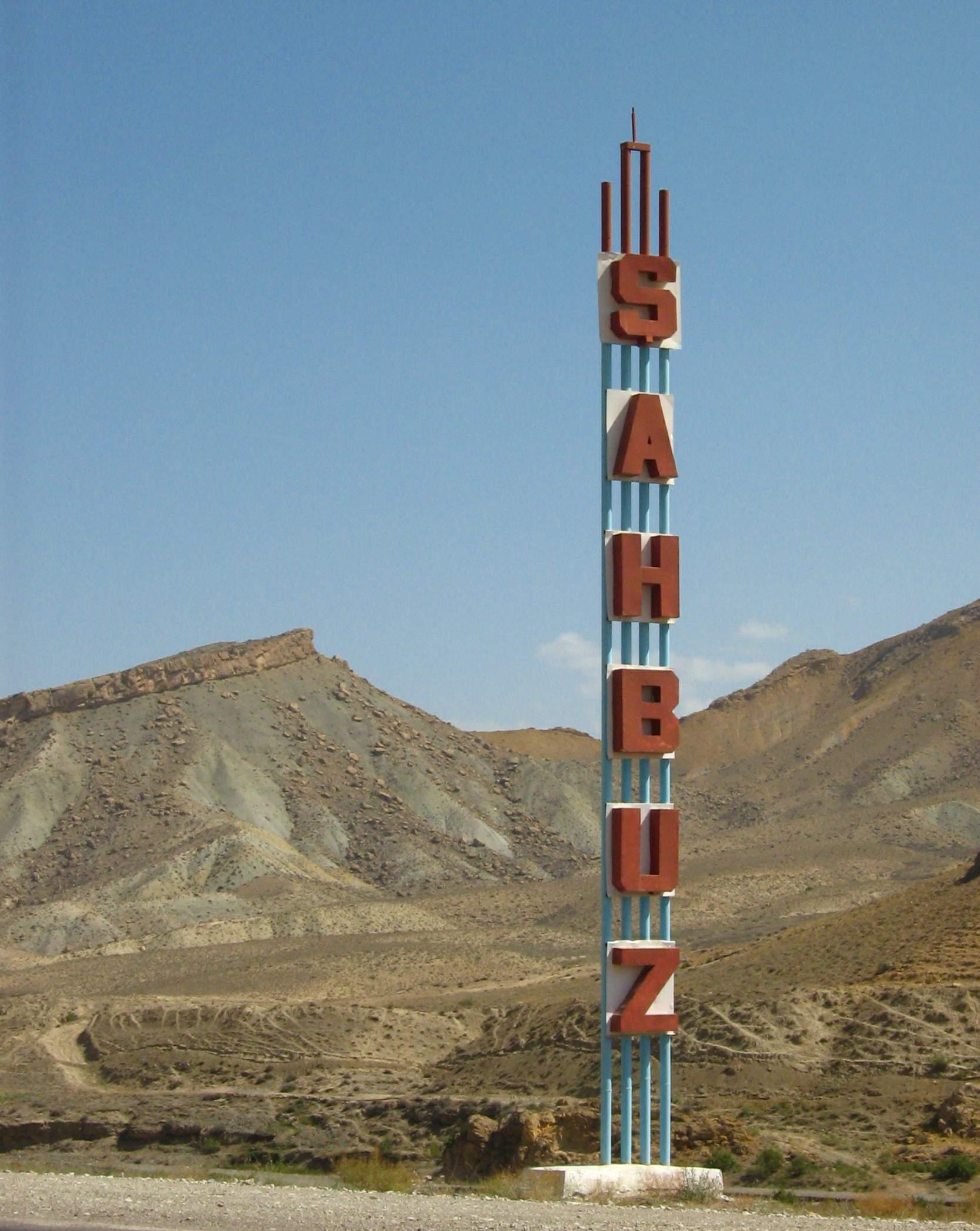
Road sign at the entrance to Shakhbuz District

Shahbuz District (Azerbaijani: Şahbuz rayonu) is one of the 7 districts of the Nakhchivan Autonomous Republic of Azerbaijan. The district borders the districts of Julfa, Babek, and the Syunik and Vayots Dzor provinces of Armenia. Its capital and largest city is Shahbuz. As of 2020, the district had a population of 25,300.

== Overview ==
Covering 27 villages and plateaus of the Oyuqlucaqaya, Bazaryurd, Dərəbash, Qachdash, Nərkechi and Armudlu, the region of Dərəşahbuz was established in the 16th century and functioned up to 40th years of the 19th century. In 1925, it was named Narimanov District in the administrative-territorial unit of Nakhchivan (encompassing 30 villages) and renamed Shahbuz in 1930. In 1963, the district was abolished and given to the Nakhchivan (since 1978, Babak) region; Shahbuz has operated as an independent district since 1965.

In 2007, the settlement of Shahbuz was given city status. In 2013, by decree of President of Azerbaijan Republic, Qarababa village was dissolved and added into the administrative territory of the city of Shahbuz.

Shahbuz district is located in the north of NAR. It is a mountainous area. Salvarti (3162 m), Uchgardash (3156 m), and Kechaldagh (3115 m) are the highest points. Like the rest of the republic, many groundwaters flow in the region, such as badamli, batabat, caravansarai, bichanak and other mineral waters. There are sulfur, construction materials, peat deposits. The district has the river Nakhchivanchay River and its tributaries - Kuku, Shahbuz, Salvarti - and Ganligol and Batabat Lakes. "Badamli" resort was built near the Badamli mineral water plant.

== Etymology ==
There are different versions of the etymology of the name of Shahbuz. At the historical sources, first time the name of "Shahbuz" can be found on the map which shows treasury of copper coins of the state of Eldiguzids and in the historical work of Sharaf ad-Din Ali Yazdi "Zafarnama", historian of Amir Timur.

== Population ==
According to the State Statistics Committee, as of 2018, the population of the region recorded 25.1 thousand persons, which increased by 4.5 thousand persons (21.8 percent) from 20.6 thousand persons in 2000. Of the total population, 12.7 thousand are men and 12.4 thousand are women.

The population of district by the year (at the beginning of the year, thsd. persons)
Population	2000	2001	2002	2003	2004	2005	2006	2007	2008	2009	2010	2011	2012	2013	2014	2015	2016	2017	2018
Shahbuz region	20.6	20.8	21.0	21.2	21.5	21.8	22.0	22.2	22.5	22.7	22.9	23.2	23.6	24.0	24.4	24.6	24.8	24.9	25.1
urban population	2.6	2.6	2.6	2.7	3.0	3.1	3.2	3.2	3.3	3.4	3.7	3.8	3.8	3.9	5.1	5.1	5.1	5.2	5.2
rural population	18.0	18.2	18.4	18.5	18.5	18.7	18.8	19.0	19.2	19.3	19.2	19.4	19.8	20.1	19.3	19.5	19.7	19.7	19.9

This indicator shows the number of people that live in this region in 2005:

#	Municipality	Population
1	Şahbuz	4,507
2	Keçili	1,663
3	Kolanı	1,379
4	Kükü	1,451
5	Şahbuzkənd	1,187
6	Külüs	1,169
7	Biçənək	1,157
8	Badamlı	1,078
9	Aşağı Qışlaq	904
10	Nursu	799
11	Mahmudoba	797
12	Qızıl Qışlaq	692
13	Sələsüz	588
14	Badamlı	582
15	Güney Qışlaq	545
16	Ayrınc	544
17	Yuxarı Qışlaq	516
18	Gömür	474
19	Ağbulaq	436
20	Türkeş	399
21	Daylaqlı	395
22	Mərəlik	215
23	Kiçikoba	171
24	Şada	161
25	Total	21,809

== See also ==
- Shahbuz State Reserve
