= Administrative divisions of Azerbaijan =

Azerbaijan is administratively divided into 67 districts (rayon) and 11 cities (şəhər) that are subordinate to the Republic. Out of these districts and cities, 7 districts and 1 city are located within the Nakhchivan Autonomous Republic. The districts are further divided into municipalities (bələdiyyə).

Additionally, the districts of Azerbaijan are grouped into 14 Economic Regions (İqtisadi Rayon). On 7 July 2021, President of Azerbaijan Ilham Aliyev signed a decree "On the new division of economic regions in the Republic of Azerbaijan".

== Administrative divisions ==
=== Contiguous Azerbaijan ===
Map of administrative divisions of Azerbaijan.

The list below represents the districts of contiguous Azerbaijan. For those of the Nakhchivan exclave, see further below.

Map ref.	Administrative division	Azerbaijani name	Capital	Area (km^{2})	Population census (2019)	Note
1	Absheron District	Abşeron	Xırdalan	1,360	476,819	Includes an exclave in Baku
2	Aghjabadi District	Ağcabədi	Aghjabadi	1,760	149,660	
3	Aghdam District	Ağdam	Aghdam	1,076	78,323	
4	Agdash District	Ağdaş	Agdash	1,050	103,267	
5	Aghstafa District	Ağstafa	Agstafa	1,500	84,918	
6	Agsu District	Ağsu	Agsu	1,020	77,712	
7	Şirvan (city)	Şirvan		30	82,135	Known as Ali Bayramli (Əli Bayramlı) until 2008
8	Astara District	Astara	Astara	620	105,083	
9	Baku (city)	Bakı		2,130	2,616,948	Capital and largest city of Azerbaijan
10	Balakan District	Balakən	Balakan	920	107,870	
11	Barda District	Bərdə	Barda	960	182,633	
12	Beylagan District	Beyləqan	Beylagan	1,130	91,619	
13	Bilasuvar District	Biləsuvar	Bilasuvar	1,400	113,412	
14	Jabrayil District	Cəbrayıl	Jabrayil	1,050	81,700	
15	Jalilabad District	Cəlilabad	Jalilabad	1,440	207,565	
16	Dashkasan District	Daşkəsən	Dashkasan	1,050	33,797	
17	Shabran District	Şabran	Shabran	1,090	56,482	Known as Davachi (Dəvəçi) until 2010
18	Fuzuli District	Füzuli	Füzuli	1,390	63,582	
19	Gadabay District	Gədəbəy	Gadabay	1,290	95,756	
20	Ganja (city)	Gəncə		110	352,196	
21	Goranboy District	Goranboy	Goranboy	1,760	104,916	
22	Goychay District	Göyçay	Goychay	740	115,213	
23	Hajigabul District	Hacıqabul	Hajiqabul	1,640	73,634	
24	Imishli District	İmişli	Imishli	1,820	129,259	
25	Ismayilli District	İsmayıllı	Ismayilli	2,060	79,223	
26	Kalbajar District	Kəlbəcər	Kalbajar	2,314	19,818	
27	Kurdamir District	Kürdəmir	Kurdamir	1,630	111,483	
28	Lachin District	Laçın	Lachin	1,840	11,673	
29	Lankaran District	Lənkəran	Lankaran	1,540	220,413	
30	Lankaran (city)	Lənkəran		70	(83,300)	2019 Census figure included in Lankaran District
31	Lerik District	Lerik	Lerik	1,080	80,735	
32	Masally District	Masallı	Masally	720	219,607	
33	Mingachevir (city)	Mingəçevir		130	119,977	
34	Naftalan (city)	Naftalan		30	9,291	
35	Neftchala District	Neftçala	Neftchala	1,450	83,792	
36	Oghuz District	Oğuz	Oghuz	1,220	42,424	
37	Qabala District	Qəbələ	Qabala	1,550	101,580	
38	Qakh District	Qax	Qakh	1,490	51,519	
39	Qazax District	Qazax	Qazax	700	92,912	Partly under de facto control of Armenia
40	Gobustan District	Qobustan	Gobustan	1,370	44,348	
41	Quba District	Quba	Quba	2,580	161,631	
42	Qubadli District	Qubadlı	Qubadli	800	(36,700)	
43	Qusar District	Qusar	Qusar	1,540	98,307	
44	Saatly District	Saatlı	Saatly	1,180	104,801	
45	Sabirabad District	Sabirabad	Sabirabad	1,470	177,137	
46	Shaki District	Şəki	Shaki	2,430	178,648	
47	Shaki (city)	Şəki		9	(63,700)	
48	Salyan District	Salyan	Salyan	1,790	136,917	
49	Shamakhi District	Şamaxı	Shamakhi	1,610	102,494	
50	Shamkir District	Şəmkir	Shamkir	1,660	212,427	
51	Samukh District	Samux	Samukh	1,450	56,696	
52	Siyazan District	Siyəzən	Siyazan	700	40,896	
53	Sumgait (city)	Sumqayıt		80	491,068	
54	Shusha District	Şuşa	Shusha	290	5,396	
55	Tartar District	Tərtər	Tartar	109	85,426	
56	Tovuz District	Tovuz	Tovuz	1,900	164,119	
57	Ujar District	Ucar	Ujar	850	82,949	
58	Khachmaz District	Xaçmaz	Khachmaz	1,050	170,022	
59	Khankendi (city)	Xankəndi		8	58,322	
60	Goygol District	Göygöl	Goygol	1,030	66,774	Known as Khanlar (Xanlar) until 2008
61	Khizi District	Xızı	Khizi	1,850	17,903	
62	Khojaly District	Xocalı	Khojaly	940	17,050	
63	Khojavend District	Xocavənd	Khojavend	1,460	(42,100)	
64	Yardimli District	Yardımlı	Yardimli	670	64,027	
65	Yevlakh District	Yevlax	Yevlakh	1,540	130,741	
66	Yevlakh (city)	Yevlax		95	59,036	
67	Zangilan District	Zəngilan	Zangilan	710	(40,500)	
68	Zagatala District	Zaqatala	Zaqatala	1,350	125,831	
69	Zardab District	Zərdab	Zardab	860	57,022	
70	Aghdara District	Ağdərə	Aghdara	1161		Became a district in December 2023.
			TOTAL	81,100	9,634,154 (Note: Including an estimated 148,795 for Nagorno-Karabakh (Artsakh) estimated for 2019 by the Artsakh Statistical Service.)	

=== Nakhchivan Autonomous Republic ===
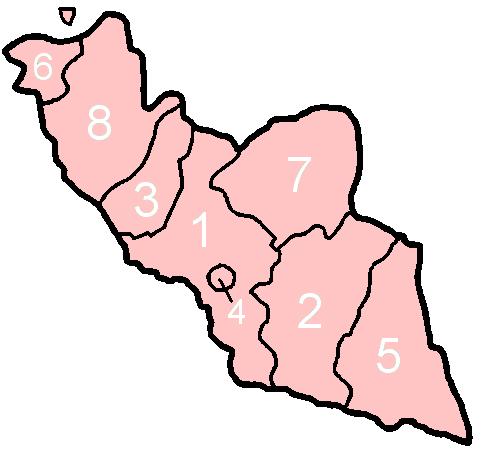
The subdivisions of Nakhchivan: 1. Babek District; 2. Julfa District; 3. Kangarli District; 4. Nakhchivan (city) / 5. Ordubad District; 6. Sadarak District; 7. Shahbuz District; 8. Sharur District

The seven districts and one municipality of the Nakhchivan Autonomous Republic are listed below.

Map ref.	Administrative division	Azerbaijani name	Capital	Area (km^{2})	Population census (2019)	Note
1	Babek District	Babək	Babek	900	76,002	Known as Nakhchivan until 1991
2	Julfa District	Culfa	Julfa	1,000	46,970	
3	Kangarli District	Kəngərli	Qıvraq	680	32,621	Split from Babek in March 2004
4	Nakhchivan (city)	Naxçıvan		130	94,318	Split from Nakhchivan (Babek District) in 1991
5	Ordubad District	Ordubad	Ordubad	970	50,156	Split from Julfa in 1965
6	Sadarak District	Sədərək	Sadarak	150	16,036	Split from Sharur in 1990; includes the Karki exclave under de facto control of Armenia
7	Shahbuz District	Şahbuz	Şahbuz	920	25,233	Split from Nakhchivan (Babek) in 1965
8	Sharur District	Şərur	Sharur	810	117,263	Known as Norashen until 1964 and Ilyich until 1990
			TOTAL	5,560	458,599	

== Economic regions ==
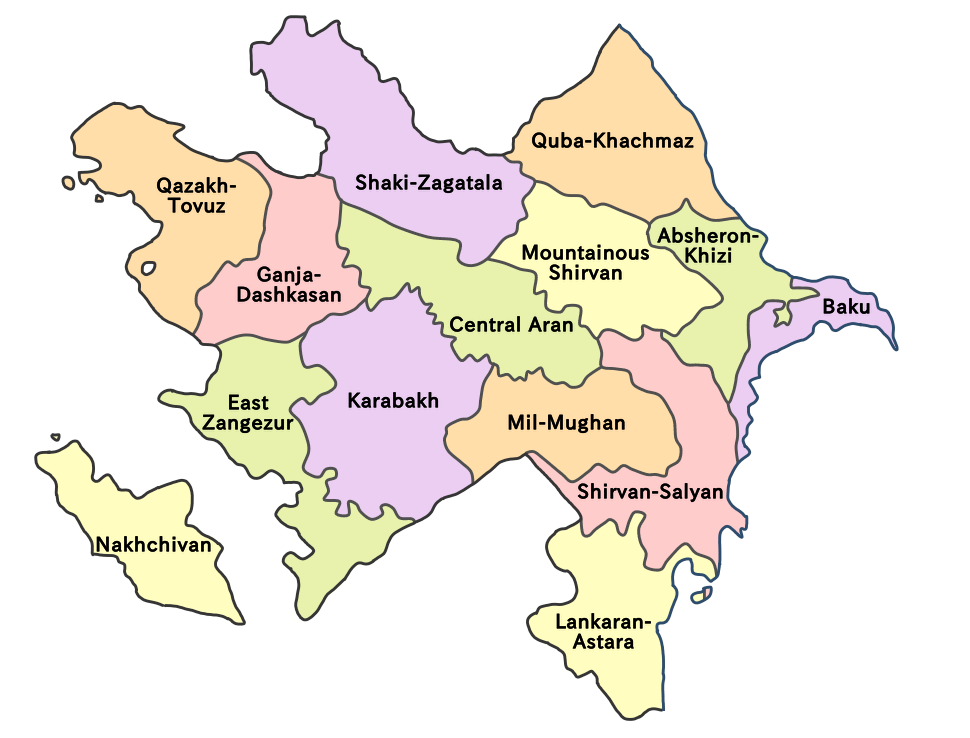
Map of economic regions of Azerbaijan (July 2021)

Economic region	Area (km^{2})	Population estimate (2021)	Population density per km^{2} (2021)	Note
Baku	2,140	2,300,500	1,075	Includes Baku itself. It is the main economic centre of Azerbaijan. Main industries: international trade, oil refining, chemical, machine-building, food, tourism, textiles. The military industry, high-tech industries, and information technologies are being developed.
Absheron-Khizi	3,730	578,800	155	Includes the Absheron and Khizi administrative districts and the city of Sumgait. The main industries are petrochemical, chemical, heavy industry, ferrous and non-ferrous metallurgy, energy, mechanical engineering, electrical engineering, light and food, construction, transport infrastructure.
Ganja-Dashkasan	5,270	611,300	116	Includes Dashkasan, Goranboy, Goygol, Samukh administrative districts and the cities of Ganja, Naftalan.
Shaki-Zagatala	8,840	630,400	71	Includes Balakan, Qakh, Qabala, Oghuz, Zagatala, Shaki administrative districts. Main industries: light, tourism and food.
Lankaran-Astara	6,070	953,600	157	Includes Astara, Jalilabad, Lerik, Yardimli, Lankaran administrative districts. Main industry: food and tourism.
Guba-Khachmaz	6,960	558,700	80	Includes Shabran, Khachmaz, Guba, Qusar, Siyazan administrative districts. Main industries: agriculture, light, tourism, food.
Central Aran	6,690	740,000	111	Includes Agdash, Goychay, Kurdamir, Ujar, Yevlakh, Zardab administrative districts, and the city of Mingachevir.
Karabakh	8,990	904,500	101	Includes Agjabadi, Aghdam, Barda, Fuzuli, Khojaly, Khojavend, Shusha, Tartar administrative regions and the city of Khankendi (Stepanakert).
East Zangezur	7,470	343,500	46	Includes Jabrayil, Kalbajar, Qubadli, Lachin, Zangilan administrative districts.
Mountainous Shirvan	6,130	324,800	53	Includes Agsu, Ismayilli, Gobustan, Shamakhi administrative districts. Main industries: light and food.
Nakhchivan	5,500	461,500	84	Includes the whole territory of the Nakhchivan Autonomous Republic. Main industries: light and food.
Gazakh-Tovuz	7,030	687,600	98	Includes Aghstafa, Gadabay, Gazakh, Shamkir, Tovuz administrative districts.
Mil-Mughan	5,670	522,600	92	Includes Beylagan, Imishli, Saatly, Sabirabad administrative districts.
Shirvan-Salyan	6,080	501,300	82	Includes Bilasuvar, Hajigabul, Neftchala, Salyan administrative districts and the city of Shirvan.
TOTALS	86,570	10,119,100	111	

== Nagorno-Karabakh ==
The territory of former Nagorno-Karabakh Autonomous Oblast presently consists of the districts of Khojavend, Shusha, Khojaly and Aghdara. The Autonomous Oblast was abolished on 26 November 1991, by the Supreme Soviet of the Azerbaijan SSR. Since then, the territory of the autonomous oblast has been administratively split between the aforementioned districts.

As a result of the First Nagorno-Karabakh War, most of Nagorno-Karabakh and surrounding districts came under the occupation of ethnic Armenian forces. The self-proclaimed Republic of Artsakh also controlled a large part of southwestern Azerbaijan outside Nagorno-Karabakh. Azerbaijan regained control of all of the surrounding districts and large parts of Nagorno-Karabakh following the 2020 Nagorno-Karabakh war. Azerbaijan regained control of all of Nagorno-Karabakh following 2023 Nagorno-Karabakh clashes.

== See also ==
- ISO 3166-2:AZ
- List of regions of Azerbaijan by Human Development Index
