= Əmillər =

Village in Azerbaijan

- Location within Azerbaijan
- Coordinates: 39°44′13″N 46°45′02″E
- Country: Azerbaijan
- District: Shusha District
- Economic Region: Karabakh
- Time zone: UTC+4
  - Summer (DST): UTC+5
- Postal code: AZ5800
- Area code: +994 26

Əmillər is a village in the Shusha District of Azerbaijan.
