= Aran Economic Region =

Former economic region in Azerbaijan

Aran Economic Region Aran iqtisadi rayonu
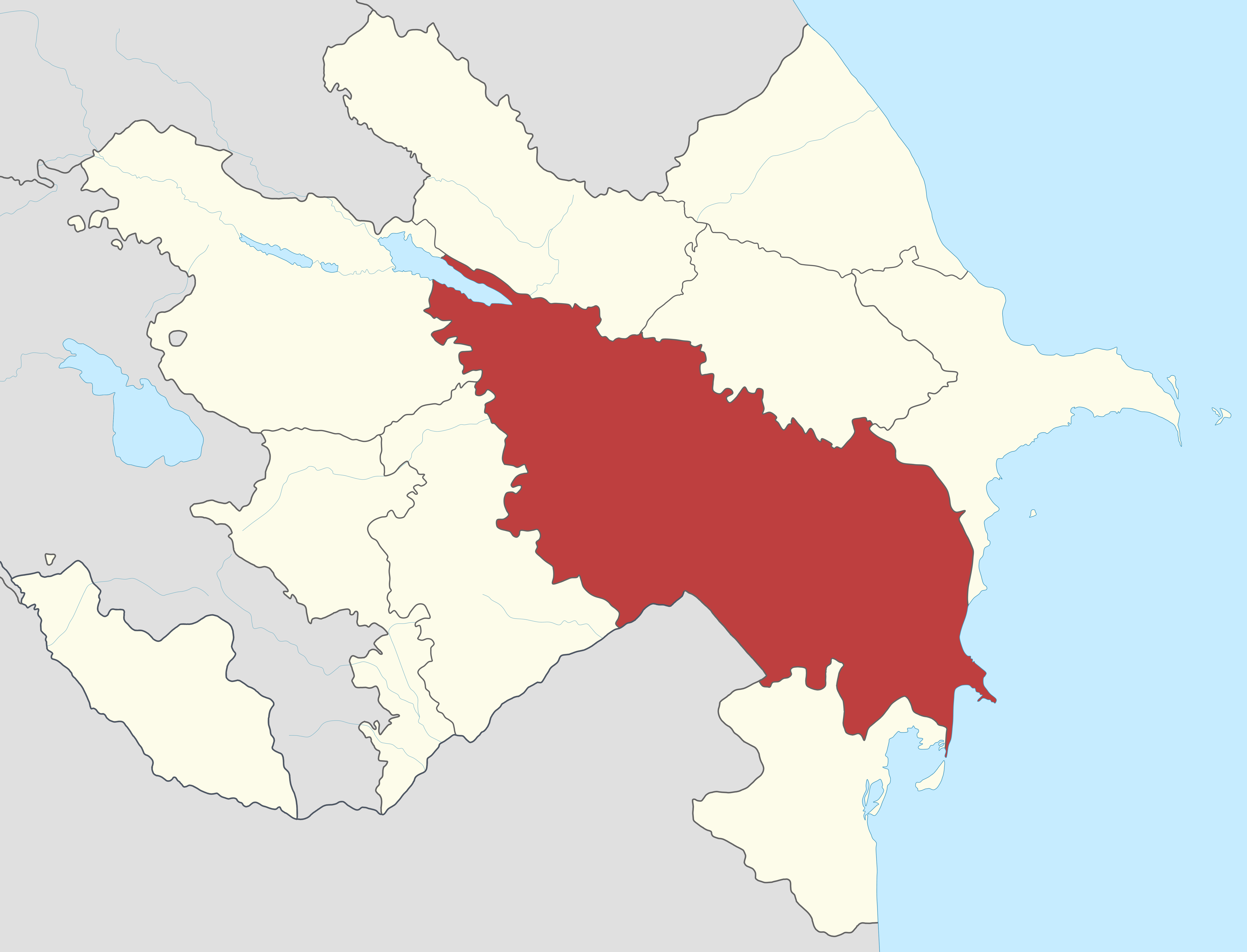
- Aran economic region is located in central Azerbaijan
- Country: Azerbaijan

Area
  - Total: 21,430 km^{2} (8,270 sq mi)

Population
  - Total: 1,893,036
- HDI (2022): 0.712 high · 8th

Aran Economic Region (Azerbaijani: Aran iqtisadi rayonu) was one of the 10 economic regions of Azerbaijan. It bordered Iran to the south, as well as the economic regions of Upper Karabakh, Ganja-Gazakh, Shaki-Zagatala, Mountainous Shirvan, Absheron, and Lankaran. The region consisted of the districts of Agdash, Aghjabadi, Barda, Beylagan, Bilasuvar, Goychay, Hajigabul, Imishli, Kurdamir, Neftchala, Saatly, Sabirabad, Salyan, Ujar, Yevlakh, Zardab and the cities of Mingachevir and Shirvan.

== Territory ==
The territory of the economic region was 21,430 km^{2} and covers 24.7% of Azerbaijan.

== Population ==
Population by sex, towns and regions, urban settlements of the Republic of Azerbaijan at the beginning of the 2018
Towns and regions	Total	Urban places	Rural places
Aran economic region	2,006.0	749.5	1,256.5

== Geography and climate ==
More than 50% of the territory is plain areas below the sea level. The climate of the region is dry subtropical.

== Natural resources ==
The major natural resources of the economic region are natural gas, oil, mineral water, and construction materials. South-eastern and central regions of the economic region is rich with natural resources. The region has underground and above-ground fuel-energy resources.

== Economy ==
Main economic indicators of the region are industry and agriculture.

Economy of Aran economic region
	2013		2014		2015	
	Number of enterprises	Output, 1000 manats	Number of enterprises	Output, 1000 manats	Number of enterprises	Output, 1000 manats
Total economy	47,549	582,191.3	32,670	565,269.5	33,414	581,804.5
of which natural persons – individual entrepreneurs	45,502	401,621.5	30,685	441,956.2	30,896	517,722.1
of which:						
agriculture, forestry and fishing	1,817	35,771.9	1,504	33,154.9	1,453	18,743.7
natural persons – individual entrepreneurs	1,207	10,920.0	851	8,859.0	784	9,184.0
industry	651	59,357.6	941	56,316.8	719	17,919.6
natural persons – individual entrepreneurs	445	12,112.5	746	14,705.7	566	13,724.0
construction	294	91,194.8	349	35,956.6	426	5,728.9
natural persons – individual entrepreneurs	145	1,126.2	188	1,301.6	158	1,317.2
trade; repair of transport means	34,911	215,209.8	18,157	245,844.2	18,253	336,742.2
natural persons – individual entrepreneurs	34,112	201,505.2	17,449	231,797.4	17,479	299,989.1
transportation and storage	2,925	58,817.8	2,965	62,009.6	3,034	64,633.5
natural persons – individual entrepreneurs	2,899	58,559.1	2,940	60,960.0	2,978	63,459.3
accommodation and food service activities	1,764	83,899.2	2,278	90,634.8	2,366	96,299.7
natural persons – individual entrepreneurs	1,737	83,413.5	2,247	90,007.4	2,332	95,416.4
information and communication	9	200.1	6	113.7	11	334.2
natural persons – individual entrepreneurs	-	-	-	-	-	-
real estate activities	75	338.6	73	375.6	85	523.3
natural persons – individual entrepreneurs	61	70.4	58	203.4	65	236.3
education	25	350.9	21	345.4	44	308.4
natural persons – individual entrepreneurs	-	-	-	-	-	-
human health and social work activities	30	787.4	32	1,109.2	44	1,105.1
natural persons – individual entrepreneurs	-	-	-	-	-	-
other fields	5,048	36,263.2	6,344	39,408.7	6,979	39,465.9
natural persons – individual entrepreneurs	4,896	33,914.6	6,206	34,121.7	6,534	34,395.8

=== Industry ===
The industrial sector of the region includes light and food industries, chemical, machinery, and construction material production. There are chemical industry enterprises in Salyan, Neftchala, and Mingechevir cities. Machinery is developed in Shirvan, Mingechevir, and Salyan. Enterprises of light industry are facilitated in all administrative divisions of the economic region. Major areas of the light industry in the region are cotton production, cotton clothing, artificial leather production, and carpet-making. 90% of cotton production of the country is produced in the Aran economic region. Fruit-vegetables processing, meat-milk, fishery canned products, and livestock products are part of food industry in the economic region.

=== Agriculture ===
Viniculture, dry-subtropical fruit-growing, wheat production, cotton production, and horticulture are the main parts of agriculture in the region.

=== Transportation ===
The region is on the high transport lines of Azerbaijan. Those transport lines connect the capital city Baku with other economic regions, as well as with Iran, Georgia, and Turkey. There is Yevlakh-Baku airline available as well.

== Yevlakh Regional Business Center and Administrative Building of Aran ==
The total area of the center is over 6900 m ^{2}. The center comprises a business center, administrative rooms, and auxiliary buildings, an exhibition hall, an assembly hall for 180 people and small conference halls. The purpose of the center is to identify prime concerns related to the socio-economic development of the Aran economic region, to make proposals on these concerns, implement regional policies, develop entrepreneurship, support small and medium entrepreneurs, organize awareness, consulting and information services.

== See also ==
- Administrative divisions of Azerbaijan
- Guba-Khachmaz economic region
