= Upper Karabakh Economic Region =

Former economic region in Azerbaijan

- Economic region
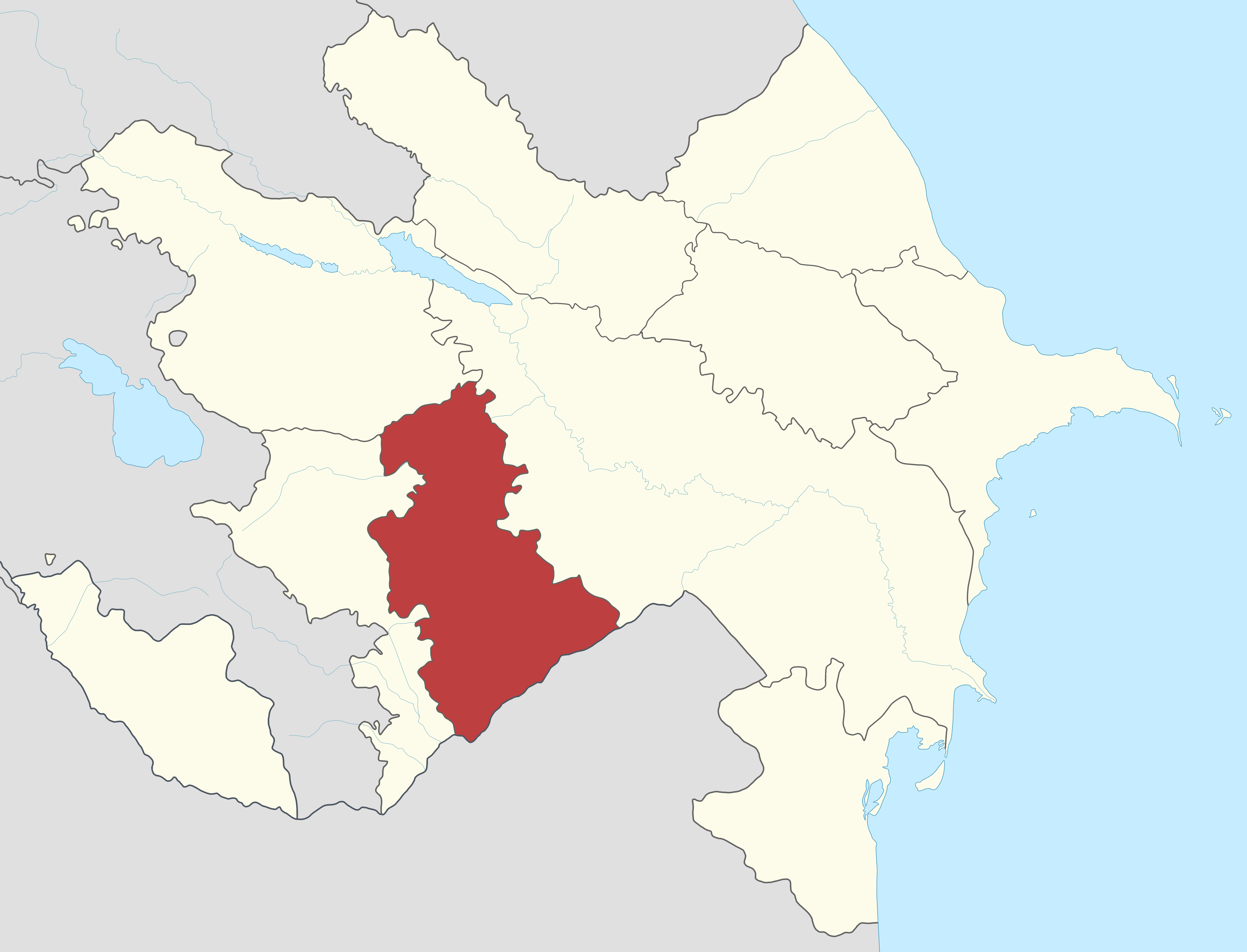
- Upper Karabakh Economic Region in Azerbaijan
- Abolished: 7 July 2021

Upper Karabakh Economic Region (Azerbaijani: Yuxarı Qarabağ iqtisadi rayonu) was one of the 10 economic regions of Azerbaijan. It bordered Iran to the south, as well as the economic regions of Kalbajar-Lachin, Ganja-Gazakh and Aran. The region consisted of the districts of Tartar, Aghdam, Khojaly, Khankendi, Shusha, Khojavend, Jabrayil and Fuzuli.

The region was abolished on 7 July 2021 and its territory was split between the Karabakh Economic Region and East Zangezur Economic Region.

== Transport network ==
Alat-Julfa, Yevlakh-Agdam-Khankendi railways pass through the territory of the economic-geographical region. Barda-Agdam-Khankendi-Shusha-Lachin, Agdam-Khojavend-Fuzuli-Horadiz, Alat-Julfa, Tartar-Agdara-Kalbajar highways connect the territory of the economic-geographical region with other regions of the republic (Table 5.15).

Public roads in the economic-geographical region, km (2012)

City and administrative region	Total	By degree				
City and administrative region	Total	I	II	III	IV	V
Ağdam rayonu	131	-	-	72	37	22
Füzuli rayonu	246	-	-	98	133	15
Tərtər rayonu	207	-	-	89	99	19
İqtisadi rayon	584	-	-	259	269	56
Azərbaycan Res	14851*	330	1128	3764	8724	905
· — The total length of roads in the country does not include roads in the occupied territories
