= Fruit sector in Azerbaijan =

The fruit sector in Azerbaijan is a developing industry. The sector covered 171,600 ha. of land in 2016. Grape, apple, orange, pear and pomegranate are one of the major crops in fruit production in Azerbaijan.

== Statistics ==
Between 2000 and 2016, the area for fruit cultivation has grown 2-3% per year. The area of fruit and berries cultivation areas has increased over the time, while area for grape production stayed more or less the same. The area for hazelnut cultivation has increased by double.

Production of fruit by types, all categories of farms (1000 t)
Types of fruits	2010	2011	2012	2013	2014	2015	2016	2017
Total	729.5	765.8	810.0	853.8	850.8	888.4	882.8	954.8
Orchards	727.6	763.9	808.2	852.2	849.1	886.5	880.6	946.4
including:								
apple	211.7	223.1	234.8	246.7	252.3	256.4	254.3	275.1
pear	35.5	36.6	39.2	40.7	40.0	42.0	40.7	50.5
quince	22.6	23.9	27.1	27.8	27.2	29.4	28.2	29.6
peach	16.7	18.0	23.6	26.6	28.1	22.6	24.0	24.3
apricot	19.2	18.7	24.0	23.9	21.7	24.0	25.4	26.9
cherries	18.1	19.4	23.1	24.7	25.7	31.2	34.9	36.1
sour cherries	6.3	6.3	7.1	7.6	7.7	9.0	9.8	10.3
plum	20.4	22.1	24.7	25.3	25.6	27.9	28.8	33.6
cherryplum	19.9	20.8	22.3	22.9	22.0	24.4	23.0	24.9
nut	8.5	8.9	9.2	9.6	8.8	10.9	9.5	9.9
hazel-nut	29.5	32.9	29.6	31.2	30.0	32.6	34.3	45.5
almond	0.5	0.6	0.6	0.7	0.5	1.1	1.1	1.1
pistachios	0.0	0.0	0.0	0.0	0.0	0.0	0.0	0.0
chestnut	0.8	0.8	0.8	0.8	0.8	0.8	0.8	0.6
pomegranate	126.9	135.4	141.6	149.8	153.4	158.1	145.1	156.8
persimmon	142.2	146.1	140.1	143.1	140.4	146.6	142.9	147.2
fig	8.5	8.8	9.3	9.4	9.4	9.7	8.8	9.3
olive	1.9	1.7	1.3	0.8	0.8	1.1	1.6	1.7
zizyphus	0.1	0.1	0.1	0.1	0.1	0.2	0.1	0.1
oleaster	0.6	0.6	0.6	0.7	0.6	0.6	0.6	0.6
cornelian cherries	3.0	2.9	3.2	3.2	3.2	3.3	4.2	4.2
medlar	3.4	3.4	3.7	4.1	4.0	4.0	3.7	3.6
feykhoa	9.7	10.7	12.3	14.1	11.7	12.8	9.6	9.2
lemon	3.4	3.5	3.9	4.3	4.0	4.2	4.6	4.6
orange	0.8	0.8	1.1	1.6	1.6	2.0	3.0	3.0
mandarine	15.6	16.0	23.3	30.8	26.5	29.5	39.2	35.2
other fruits	1.8	1.8	1.6	1.7	3.0	2.1	2.4	2.5
Berries	1.9	1.9	1.8	1.6	1.7	1.9	2.2	8.4
kivi	0.2	0.2	0.2	0.2	0.2	0.2	0.2	0.2

Most of the areas for cultivation of fruits and berries are privately owned. Agricultural enterprises cover 7% of the fruit and berries area. Approximately 30% of grape production area is used by agricultural enterprises.

Cultivated areas per farm type (1,000 ha)
	2010	2011	2012	2013	2014	2015	2016
Fruit and berries area on agricultural enterprises	7.6	6.1	6.5	6.3	5.9	8.2	12.0
Grapes area on agricultural enterprises	3.7	4.4	4.7	4.8	4.3	4.5	4.6
Fruit and berries area on privately owned farms, family farms and households	120.1	124.4	127.0	127.9	132.6	135.9	159.6
Grapes area on privately owned farms, family farms and households	11.7	11.5	11.6	11.3	11.6	11.6	11.4

=== Import and Exports ===
In 2014, due to improvement of irrigation systems and provision of subsidies and incentives to farmers, the production of fruit and berries increased, and imports were decreased.

Fruit and berries (tons)	2012	2013	2014
Production	810 022	853 757	850 803
Import	63 809	22 447	15 104
Export	220 735	173 465	158 407

== Hazelnut ==
Shaki-Zagatala economic region accounts for 74 percent of hazelnut production. In 2005-2015, hazelnut gardens in Azerbaijan increased by 12 thousand 358 hectares, and average yield from one hectare dropped by 21%. The highest indicator in this period was registered in Shaki-Zagatala economic region. Thus, hazelnuts production increased by 5.6 percent in the region and 36.3 percent in the planting of gardens.

According to the Presidential Decree of November 16, 2016 "On additional measures for the strengthening of state support for the development of silkworm and nutrition" more than 10 thousand hectares of new hazelnut bins were laid. Taking into account the prospects for the development of bush fruits, the draft State Program on the development of nuts such as almond, almond, walnut and chestnut in 2017-2026 is being developed. The project envisages further strengthening of the work carried out in this direction and increase the area of hazelnuts by 42 thousand hectares to 80 thousand hectares.

== Citrus fruits ==
The basis for the development of citrus fruits in Azerbaijan is the creation of the subtropical plant caves in the Astara region in the 1930s with a total area of 800 hectares, and about 500 hectares of lemon, tangerine, orange, feijoa, tea, noble bay, etc. cultivation of plants has begun.

Since 1930, the planned expansion of citrus fruits in the country has begun, the development of which has accelerated in the 1970s and 1980s. During this period, along with other subtropical plants in the region, the areas of citrus were expanded.

The total area of citrus gardens in the country in 2017 increased by 1.9 times to 3191.2 hectares compared to 2010, while production increased by 2.2 times to 42.8 thousand tons. In 2017, Azerbaijan exported 30.6 thousand tons of citrus fruits, including 12.6 thousand tons of oranges, 11.9 thousand tons of lemon, 4.6 thousand tons of mandarins, 1.5 thousand tons of grapefruit and other citrus fruits have been imported.

Order No. 3227 of the President of the Republic of Azerbaijan dated September 12, 2017 "On Additional Measures Related to the Development of Citrus, Tea and Paddy Production in the Republic of Azerbaijan" has created for the development of citrus fruits.

== Grape ==
In 1980s, grape was one of the main fruit products in Azerbaijan. The production of grape has been increasing year by year due to reforms and state programs to develop viticulture in Azerbaijan.

Production, import, and export of grapes
Grapes (tons)	2012	2013	2014
Production	150 987	148 535	147 701
Import	3 534	2 951	1 122
Export	300	1 180	462

Grape production in Azerbaijan between 1985 and 2015
Years	Cultivated area	Gross harvest	Yield per ha
1985	267.8	1789.6	81.0
1990	181.4	1196.4	76.5
1995	97.7	308.7	32.6
2000	14.2	76.9	35.8
2005	9.6	79.7	61.8
2010	15.4	129.5	74.7
2015	16.1	157.1	86.6

== Apple ==
Apple orchards covers about 22,000 hectares of the Guba-Khachmaz economic region. In 2017, 120,757 tons of apple harvested in Guba. 65-70 % of apple have been exported in 2017. In general, 40,000 tons of apples have been exported from Guba-Khachmaz region.

Apple was the second most important exported fruit in 2008, while it was in the fourth ranks in 2012. The value of exported apple was 49,287 thousand USD in 2008, 30,071 thousand USD in 2009, 14,436 thousand USD in 2010, 19,296 thousand USD in 2011, and 27,595 thousand USD in 2012.

== Pomegranates ==
Pomegranates were the third most produced fruit in 2012, which was 141.6 thousand tons. In 2014, production of pomegranates was 153,423 tons, which of 121, 654 tons (79%) were produced in Aran economic region. The production of pomegranates is higher in Lankaran, Nakhchivan, and Ganja-Gazakh economic regions.

Production of pomegranates
Economic regions	2011	2012	2013	2014	2016
Ganja-Gazakh	17 680	18 327	18 415	16 508	16 141.8
Sheki-Zagatala	1 279	1 348	1 378	1 340	1 707.1
Lankaran	1 012	1 087	1 093	1 090	734.3
Guba-Khachmaz	591	506	534	932	754.1
Aran	107 464	111 717	117 949	121 654	113 201.1
Yukhari Garabagh	2 063	2 135	1 719	1 656	2 153.9
Daghlig Shirvan	4 607	4 971	7 180	8 904	9 577.5
Nakhchivan	407	414	419	244	176.5
Total in Republic	135 406	141 641	149 826	153 423	145 140.7

== Fruit growing by economic regions ==
=== Guba-Khachmaz ===
Majority of fruit cultivation in Guba-Khachmaz economic region is seedy fruits. Khachmaz, Guba, and Gusar are the most fruit-cultivated areas in the region. The main fruits species include apple, pear, plum, cherry, peach, nuts, dates, walnut, cranberries, cherries, figs, medlar, and olives.

=== Sheki- Zakatala ===
In Sheki-Zakatala walnuts, hazelnuts, chestnuts, cornel, cherry, apple, loquat, quince, fig, cranberry, and pear are cultivated. Gakh, Zakatala, Balakan, Oguz, and Sheki are the main fruit producers in the region. The region contributes 95% of nuts production.

=== Nakhchivan Autonomous Republic ===
In this economic region, stony fruits such as peach and apricot, and almond, pear, walnut, quince, apple, cherry, and oleaster are produced.

=== Aran ===
This economic region mainly produces dry sub-tropical fruits such as pomegranate and quince. Other fruit crops that are produced in this region are jujube, medlar, dates, plum, fig, walnut, cherries, and apricot.

=== Lankaran ===
Lankaran mainly cultivates citrus fruits. Orange, mandarin, kiwi, feijoa, lemon, fig, nuts, and medlar are cultivated in this region.

=== Absheron ===
The peninsula mainly produces olive, pistachio, almond and fig.

== Developments in the sector ==
On February 13, an order on "Approval of the State Program for the Development of Citrus Fruit in the Republic of Azerbaijan for 2018-2025" prepared in accordance with the Presidential Decree No. 3227 of 12 September 2017 "On Additional Measures to Develop Citrus, Tea and Paddy Production in the Republic of Azerbaijan". Upon the order, the Ministry of Finance and the Ministry of Economy must take the necessary measures to ensure that the state budget and the state investment programs are prepared in accordance with the annual budget. The Ministry of Agriculture shall coordinate the implementation of the measures envisaged by the State Program and inform the President of the Republic of Azerbaijan about the implementation of the State Program once a year. The Cabinet of Ministers is instructed to address issues arising from the order.

As a result of implementation of the State Program, it is planned to increase the production of citrus in Azerbaijan up to 100 thousand tons before 2025. The plan of measures on the development of citrus fruits in the State Program for 2018-2025 envisages involvement of local and foreign investments into citrus fruit production and processing. At the same time, according to the Action Plan, existing standards in the citrus industry should be brought into line with international requirements; small-scale farmers and farmers operating in this area should be encouraged to cooperate on voluntary cooperation; contacts with foreign companies with progressive production and export experience should be enhanced and a progressive insurance mechanism should be established. It also envisages strengthening of scientific support and staffing capacity in the field of citrus fruits, improvement of infrastructure provision, state support measures, strengthening of marketing activity and export promotion.

== See also ==
Agriculture in Azerbaijan

Ministry of Agriculture (Azerbaijan)
