= Shirvan-Salyan Economic Region =

Economic region of Azerbaijan

Coordinates: 39°27′23.9″N 49°03′42.9″E

Shirvan-Salyan Economic Region Şirvan-Salyan iqtisadi rayonu (Azerbaijani)
- İqtisadi rayon (Economic region)
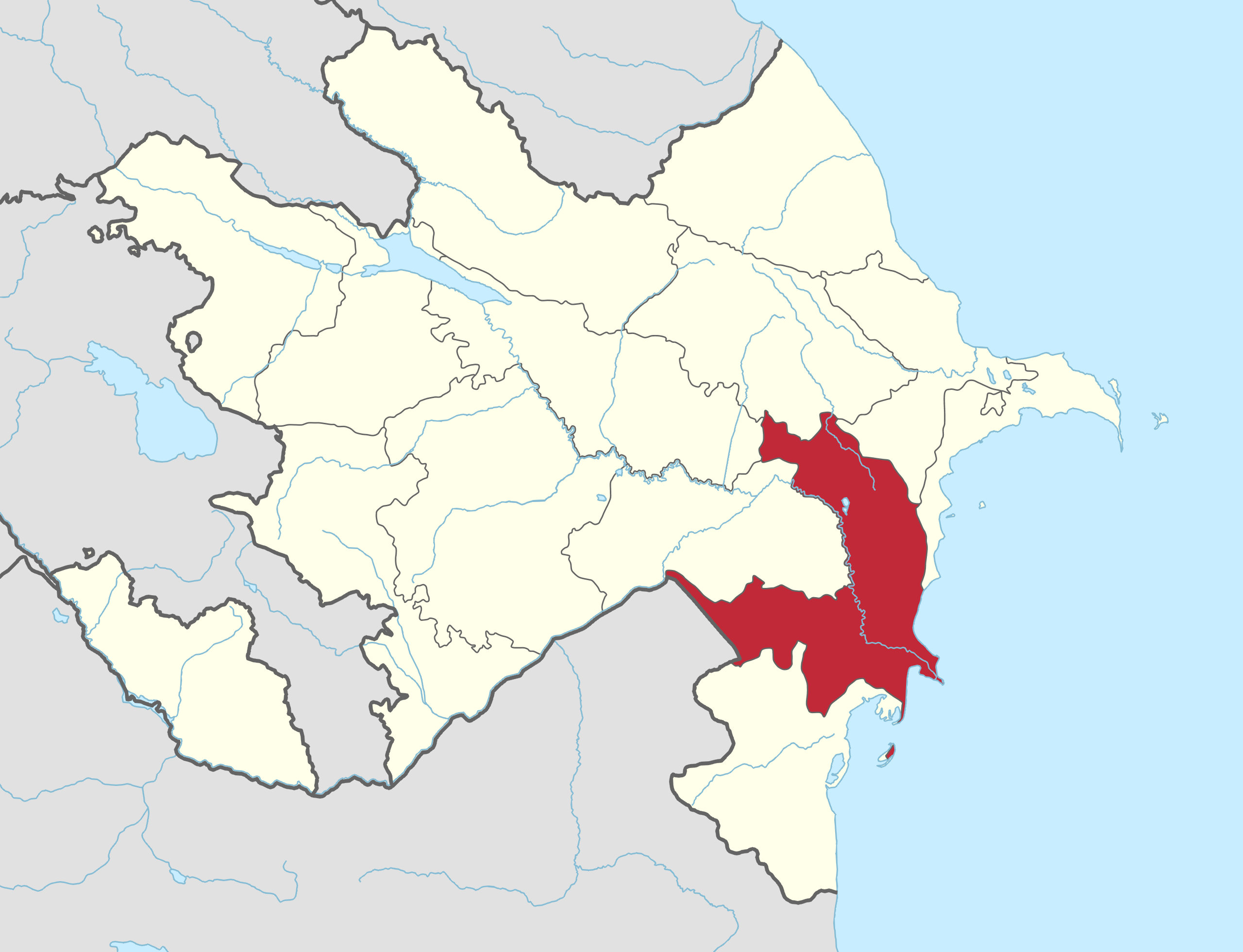
- Shirvan-Salyan Economic Region in Azerbaijan
- Country: Azerbaijan
- Administrative divisions: 5 (4 districts, 1 city)
- Established: 7 July 2021
- Largest city and regional center: Shirvan

Area
  - Total: 6,080 km^{2} (2,350 sq mi)
  - Rank: 8th

Population (1 January 2026)
  - Total: 499,800
  - Rank: 11th
  - Density: 82.2/km^{2} (213/sq mi)

Shirvan-Salyan Economic Region (Azerbaijani: Şirvan-Salyan iqtisadi rayonu) is one of the 14 economic regions of Azerbaijan. It borders Iran to the west, as well as the economic regions of Mil-Mughan, Central Aran, Mountainous Shirvan, Absheron-Khizi, Baku, and Lankaran-Astara. The region consists of the districts of Bilasuvar, Hajigabul, Neftchala, Salyan, as well as the city of Shirvan. It has an area of 6,080 square kilometres (2,350 sq mi). Its population was estimated to be 501,300 people in January 2021.

== History ==
Shirvan-Salyan Economic Region was established on 7 July 2021 as part of a reform of the economic region system of Azerbaijan. Its territory was part of the larger Aran Economic Region before 2021.
