= Gazakh-Tovuz Economic Region =

Economic region of Azerbaijan

Coordinates: 40°59′23.4″N 45°50′19.5″E

Gazakh-Tovuz Economic Region Qazax-Tovuz iqtisadi rayonu (Azerbaijani)
- İqtisadi rayon (Economic region)
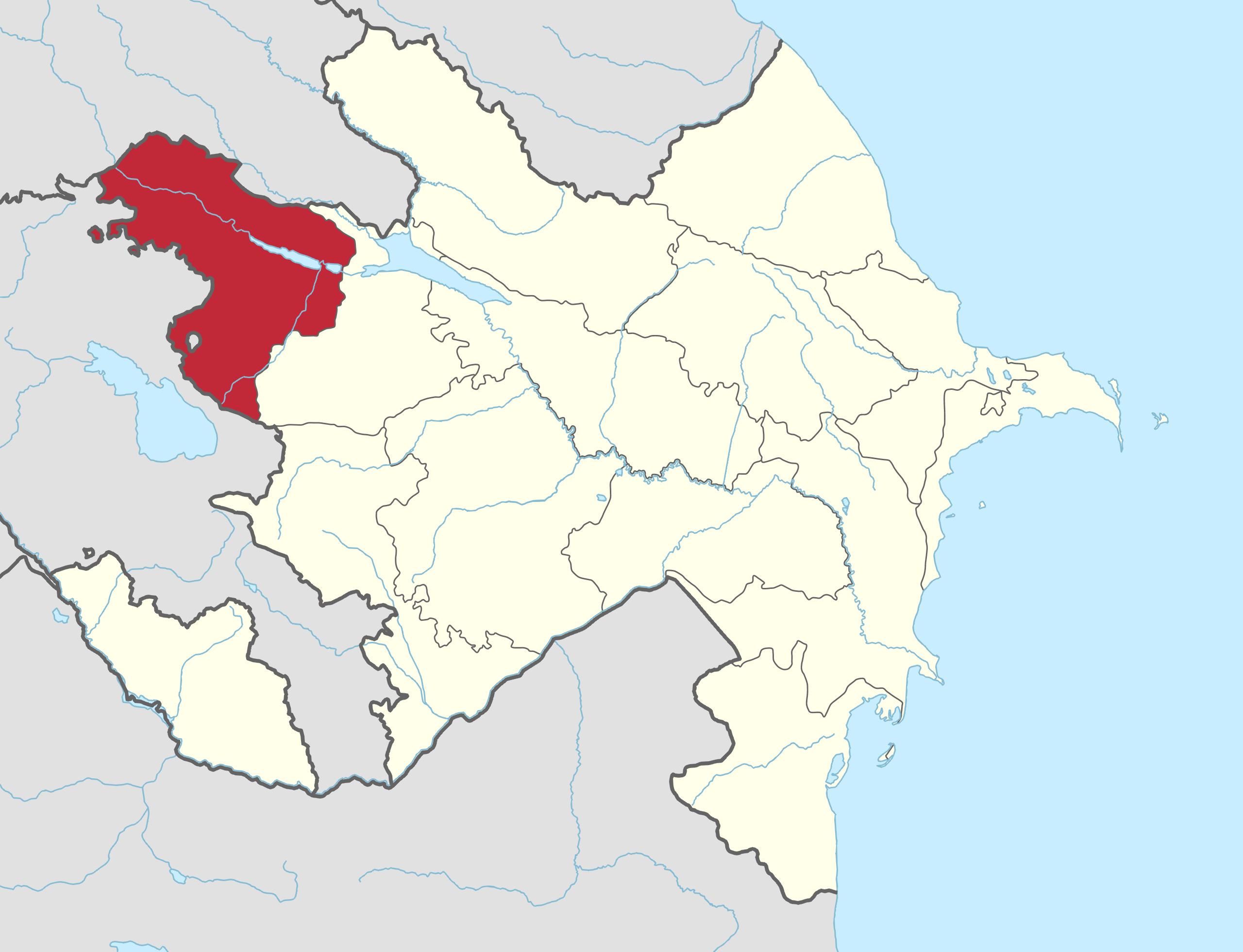
- Gazakh-Tovuz Economic Region in Azerbaijan
- Country: Azerbaijan
- Administrative divisions: 5 districts
- Established: 7 July 2021
- Largest city and regional center: Shamkir

Area
  - Total: 7,030 km^{2} (2,710 sq mi)
  - Rank: 4st

Population (1 January 2026)
  - Total: 683,000
  - Rank: 4th
  - Density: 97.2/km^{2} (252/sq mi)
- HDI (2022): 0.724 high · 6th

Gazakh-Tovuz Economic Region (Azerbaijani: Qazax-Tovuz iqtisadi rayonu) is one of the 14 economic regions of Azerbaijan. It borders Georgia to the north and Armenia to the south and west, and the Ganja-Dashkasan Economic Region to the east. The region consists of the districts of Aghstafa, Gadabay, Gazakh, Shamkir, and Tovuz. It has an area of 7,030 square kilometres (2,710 sq mi). Its population was estimated to be at 687.6 thousand people in January 2021.

== History ==
Gazakh-Tovuz Economic Region was established on 7 July 2021 as part of a reform of the economic region system of Azerbaijan. Its territory was part of the larger Ganja-Qazakh Economic Region prior to 2021.
