= Mil-Mughan Economic Region =

Economic region of Azerbaijan

Coordinates: 39°53′32.5″N 48°10′26.3″E

Mil-Mughan Economic Region Mil-Muğan iqtisadi rayonu (Azerbaijani)
- İqtisadi rayon (Economic region)
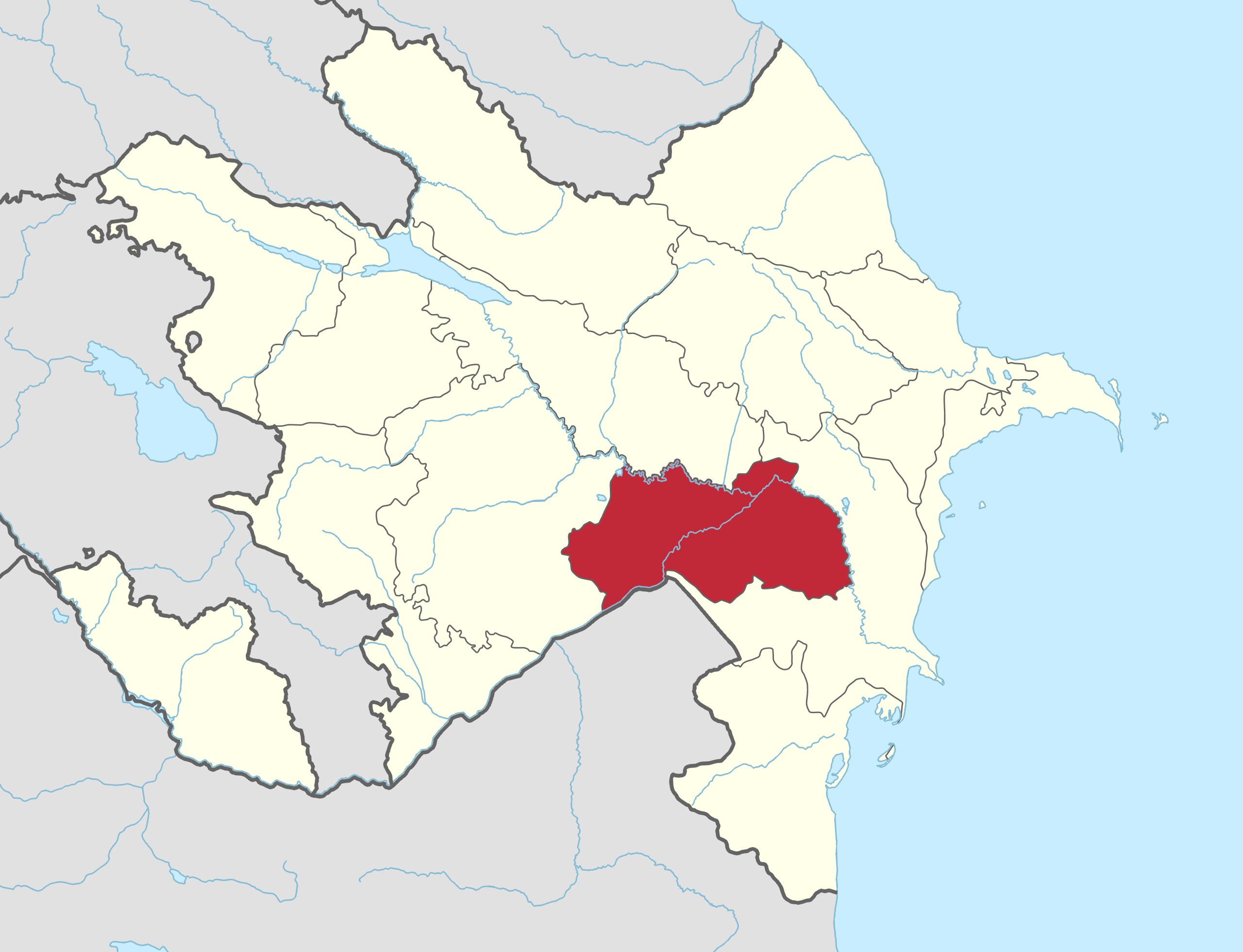
- Mil-Mughan Economic Region in Azerbaijan
- Country: Azerbaijan
- Administrative divisions: 4 districts
- Established: 7 July 2021
- Largest city: Imishli
- Regional center: Beylagan

Area
  - Total: 5,670 km^{2} (2,190 sq mi)
  - Rank: 10th

Population (1 January 2026)
  - Total: 530,500
  - Rank: 10th
  - Density: 93.6/km^{2} (242/sq mi)

Mil-Mughan Economic Region (Azerbaijani: Mil-Muğan iqtisadi rayonu) is one of the 14 economic regions of Azerbaijan. It borders Iran to the south, as well as the economic regions of Shirvan-Salyan, Central Aran, and Karabakh. The region consists of the districts of Beylagan, Imishli, Saatly, and Sabirabad. It has an area of 5,670 square kilometres (2,190 sq mi). Its population was estimated to be 522,600 in January 2021.

== History ==
Mil-Mughan Economic Region was established on 7 July 2021 as part of a reform of the economic region system of Azerbaijan. Its territory was part of the larger Aran Economic Region before 2021.
