= Mountainous Shirvan Economic Region =

Economic region of Azerbaijan

Coordinates: 40°42′19.3″N 48°26′41.9″E

Mountainous Shirvan Economic Region Dağlıq Şirvan iqtisadi rayonu (Azerbaijani)
- İqtisadi rayon (Economic region)
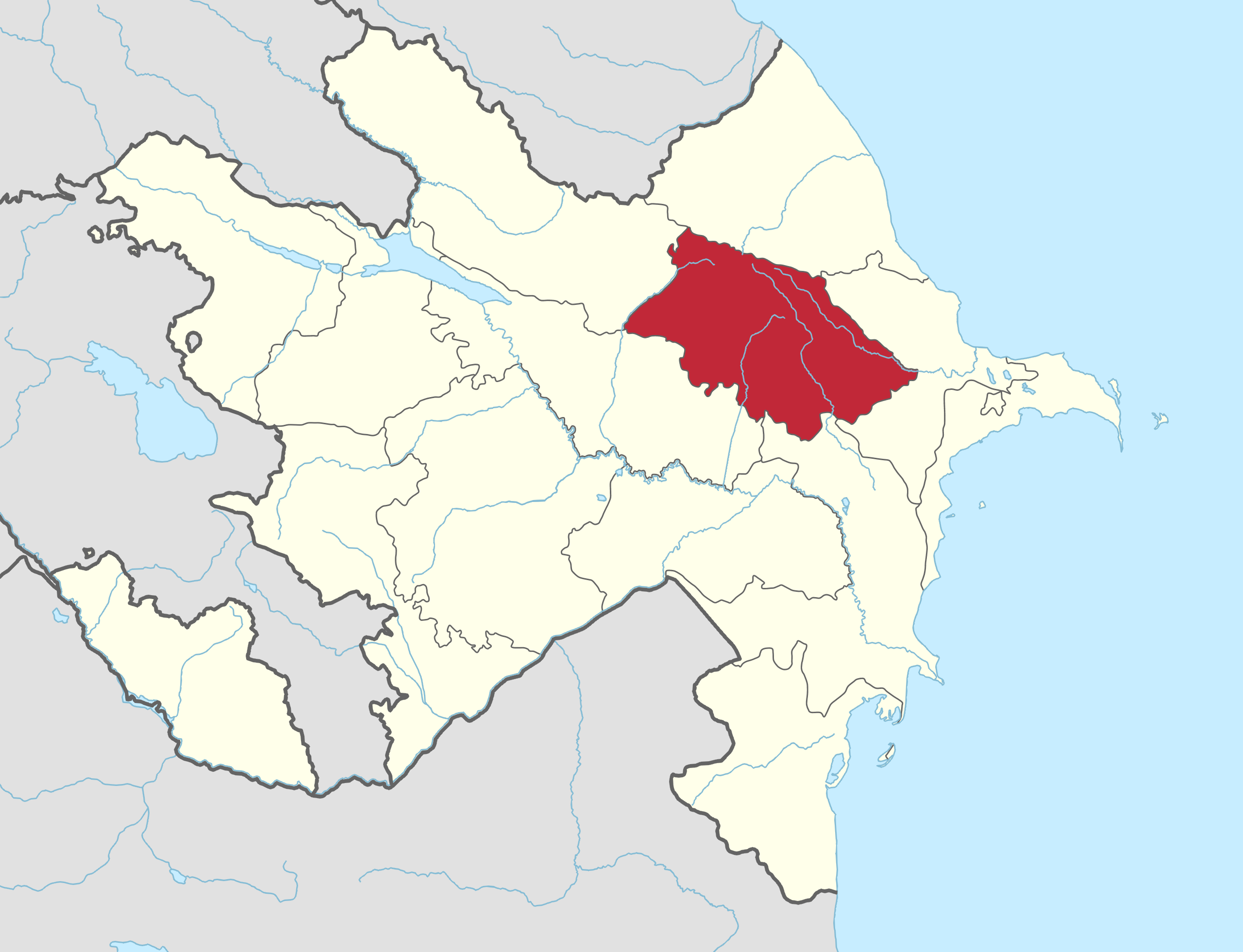
- Mountainous Shirvan Economic Region in Azerbaijan
- Country: Azerbaijan
- Administrative divisions: 4 districts
- Largest city and regional center: Shamakhi

Area
  - Total: 6,130 km^{2} (2,370 sq mi)
  - Rank: 6th

Population (1 January 2026)
  - Total: 324,500
  - Rank: 14th
  - Density: 52.9/km^{2} (137/sq mi)
- HDI (2022): 0.727 high · 5th

Mountainous Shirvan Economic Region (Azerbaijani: Dağlıq Şirvan iqtisadi rayonu) is one of the 14 economic regions of Azerbaijan. It borders the economic regions of Shaki-Zagatala, Guba-Khachmaz, Absheron-Khizi, Shirvan-Salyan, and Central Aran. The region consists of the districts of Agsu, Ismayilli, Gobustan, and Shamakhi. It has an area of 6,130 square kilometres (2,370 sq mi). Its population was estimated to be at 324.8 thousand people in January 2021.

== Geography ==
Most of the area is mountainous, and it shares borders with the Aran economic region in the south, the Shaki-Zagatala in the northwest, the Guba-Khachmaz in the northeast, and the Absheron economic regions in the east. Azerbaijan has a wide variety of flora and fauna. Within the territory of the Republic, there are around 4,100 species of vegetation.

The climate is semidesert and a dry slope (Gobustan) mild warm climate with dry summers (Gurjivan '* Shamakhi - Maraza plateau), moderately warm climate with dry winters (the areas with 1000 – 1200 m altitudes in the North - Eastern slopes of Great Caucasus Mountains), temperate climate with equal distribution of precipitations during the year (the Northern part of Ismaili region and North - Western part of Shamakhi) and mountain tundra climate (Babadag peak zone over 3000 m altitude).

== Economy ==
=== Manufacturing ===
The region houses a small manufacturing industry including carpet weaving, container producers, timber and building materials processors and agricultural machinery repair. Its agricultural industries include butter and cheese production, canneries, winemaking and fruit enterprises.

From 2004 to 2008, more than 250 enterprises were started in the zone, creating close to 19,000 new jobs. Since 2009, the number of industrial enterprises has increased from 39 to 44.

In 2016, under the framework of a program for providing concessional loans to entrepreneurs in Azerbaijan, 30 subjects in the zone received preferential loans totaling 262,000 manat.

	2010	2012	2013	2014	2015	2016
Number of operating enterprises	39	40	40	39	44	44
Industrial products (thousand azn)	10265	13234	20382	18672	17140	19631
Specific weight of the non-public sector in industrial product	19.3	40.8	46.6	51.2	44.2	40.2
Average number of workers	1564	1826	1955	2054	2002	2249
Average salary	195.1	231	279.6	297.1	308.9	319.3

=== Agriculture ===
Agriculture in Azerbaijan includes crop production and animal husbandry. Development priority is given to grain, cotton, vegetables, potatoes, fruits, viticulture, tobacco, livestock breeding, poultry farming and horse breeding. In 2008, crop production accounted for 63.1% of agricultural produce, while livestock production accounted for 36.9%. Between 1995 and 2008, the share of crop production increased by 4.5%, and equally, the proportion of livestock fell by 4.5%.

Branches of agriculture include: viticulture, wine-making, livestock and grain production. Potatoes are grown in the mountainous regions, and cotton is grown in the plains. Beekeeping, sericulture, gardening, and growing vegetables and fruits are well-developed. The area under grape cultivation is 10,324 hectares. The number of livestock reached 729,949 in 2018. Lack of freshwater is a problem.

== Transport ==
The Baku-Tbilisi railway eases access to CIS countries. The Baku-Gazakh highway passes through the Mountainous Shirvan region and connects the capital of the country with the eastern regions. Generally, the transport system both intrinsically and interregional is not well-developed in the region of Mountainous Shirvan. Reconstruction of the highways in the region is intended to achieve progress in the connection of the East and the West parts. The Baku-Shamakhi part of the highway was reconstructed. In accordance with the project relating to the organizing transport system, Baku-Gobustan-Shamakhi round way is renewed. Relating to the State Program on the development of the region's transport system considers.

The overall length of the highways in the region is 1989 kilometres long. There are both interregional and intrinsically important roads, respectively, 33.1% and 66.9%.

There was established a regional organization to regulate the auto-transport system in the Shamakhi district. The transport system has been improved after the establishment of the regional organization. For instance, roads were reconstructed in the Agsu district and a number of new roads were established between routes such as Baku-Shamakhi-Yevlakh, Agsu-Khanbulag-Nydu, Zargova, Padar-Rahimli-Arabsarvan, Chaparli-Cafarli, Sangalan, Dilman-Xatman, Bozavand, Muganli-Ismayilli, Garamaryam-Ismayilli-Shaki, Basgal-Sulut, Sardahar-Tircan, Garaybayli-Gubakhalilli, Nasimi-Gonagkend, Shamakhi-Zarat-Kheybari, Churyurd-Qizmeydan-Piribayli, Rasadkhana-Avakhil, and Shamakhi-Chol-Goylar. In order to improve transport infrastructure in the region, bridges and protective dams were established. Protective dams like Girdiman (220 meters) river and Lahic (550 meters) settlement are some of them. However, there was an established subway between Padar station and Chol-Koyler village to improve winery and vine-growing in the region.

== Communication ==
The communication system is launched in accordance with the up-to-date communication services in the region. In this way, financial services were provided in villages via the AzerPocht Platform. Intercommunication in the post web is implemented on the base of the satellite platform. Low connection places like villages there are used as satellite inventories. In accordance with the statistics, there are 56 phones for a hundred families in the region. The main parts of them are in the cities and the lower amount in the villages respectively, 82 units and 45 units.

== Education ==
Secondary schools and branches of higher education institutions (Shamakhi branch of the State Pedagogical University and the University of Odlar Yurdu), as well as cultural institutions, are present. Educational facilities, as well as cultural institutions, are focused in the Parea operated Pikulinski Observatory area.

== Biodiversity ==
Semidesert plants in the Shirvan plain zone (southern plain of Shamakhi and Agsu regions) reach up to 200 meters altitude. The semidesert plants in the valleys and large river valleys reach 400–500 meters altitude. The upper limit of a semidesert plant is 300–400 meters. In the lowland and foothills, sparse forests and shrubs are spread in mountainous terrain. The low mountain-forest zone extends in the form of a narrow belt at the altitude of 500–900 meters. The forests are pale and pale-horned. Iberian oak, oak, and vultures are present. Chestnut and chestnut oak trees are present in Ismaili forests. Hawthorn, peanuts, chips, nuts, cranberries, and cherries grow there. Ismaili State Reserve and parts of the Shahdag National Park are located there.
