= Ganja-Dashkasan Economic Region =

Economic region of Azerbaijan

Coordinates: 40°41′09.7″N 46°22′00.3″E

Ganja-Dashkasan Economic Region Gəncə-Daşkəsən iqtisadi rayonu (Azerbaijani)
- İqtisadi rayon (Economic region)
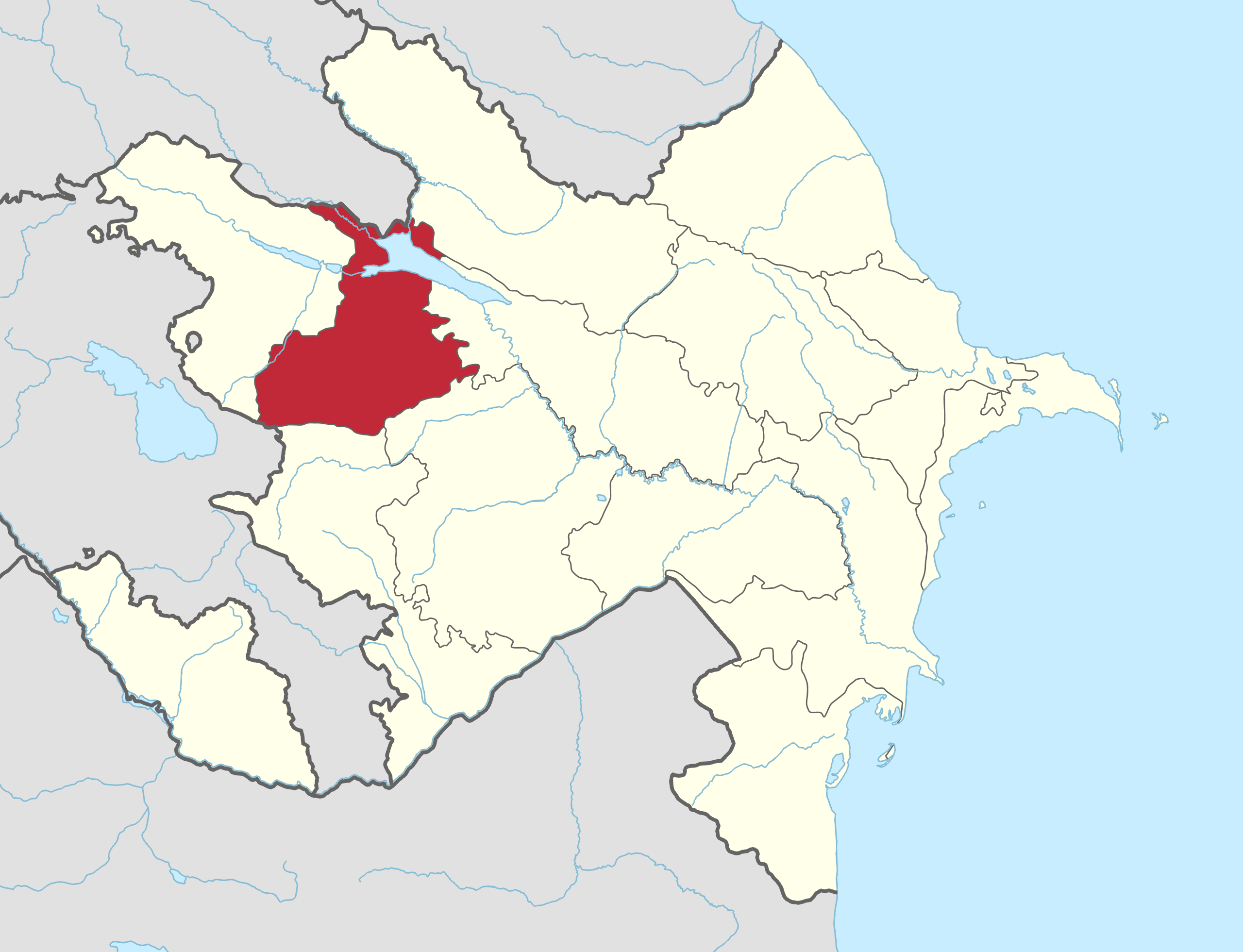
- Ganja-Dashkasan Economic Region in Azerbaijan
- Country: Azerbaijan
- Administrative divisions: 6 (4 districts, 2 cities)
- Established: 7 July 2021
- Largest city and regional center: Ganja

Area
  - Total: 5,270 km^{2} (2,030 sq mi)
  - Rank: 12th

Population (1 January 2026)
  - Total: 600,400
  - Rank: 7th
  - Density: 114/km^{2} (295/sq mi)

Ethnic groups
  - Azerbaijanis: 99.2%
  - Russians: 0.3%
  - Kurds: 0.2%
  - Turks: 0.2%
  - Others: 0.1%

Vehicle registration
  - Codes: 16 (Dashkasan), 20 (Ganja), 22 (Goranboy), 46 (Naftalan), 51 (Samukh)
- Time zone: UTC+4 (AZT)
- HDI (2022): 0.724 high · 6th

Ganja-Dashkasan Economic Region (Azerbaijani: Gəncə-Daşkəsən iqtisadi rayonu) is one of the 14 economic regions of Azerbaijan. It borders Georgia to the north and Armenia to the south, as well as the economic regions of Shaki-Zagatala, Central Aran, Karabakh, East Zangezur, and Gazakh-Tovuz. The region consists of the districts of Dashkasan, Goranboy, Goygol, Samukh, as well as the cities of Ganja and Naftalan. It has an area of 5,270 square kilometres (2,030 sq mi). Its population was estimated to be at 611.3 thousand people in January 2021.

== History ==
Ganja-Dashkasan Economic Region was established on 7 July 2021 as part of a reform of the economic region system of Azerbaijan. Its territory was part of the larger Ganja-Qazakh Economic Region before 2021.
