= Central Aran Economic Region =

Economic region of Azerbaijan

Coordinates: 40°38′37.8″N 47°25′54.9″E

Central Aran Economic Region Mərkəzi Aran iqtisadi rayonu (Azerbaijani)
- İqtisadi rayon (Economic region)
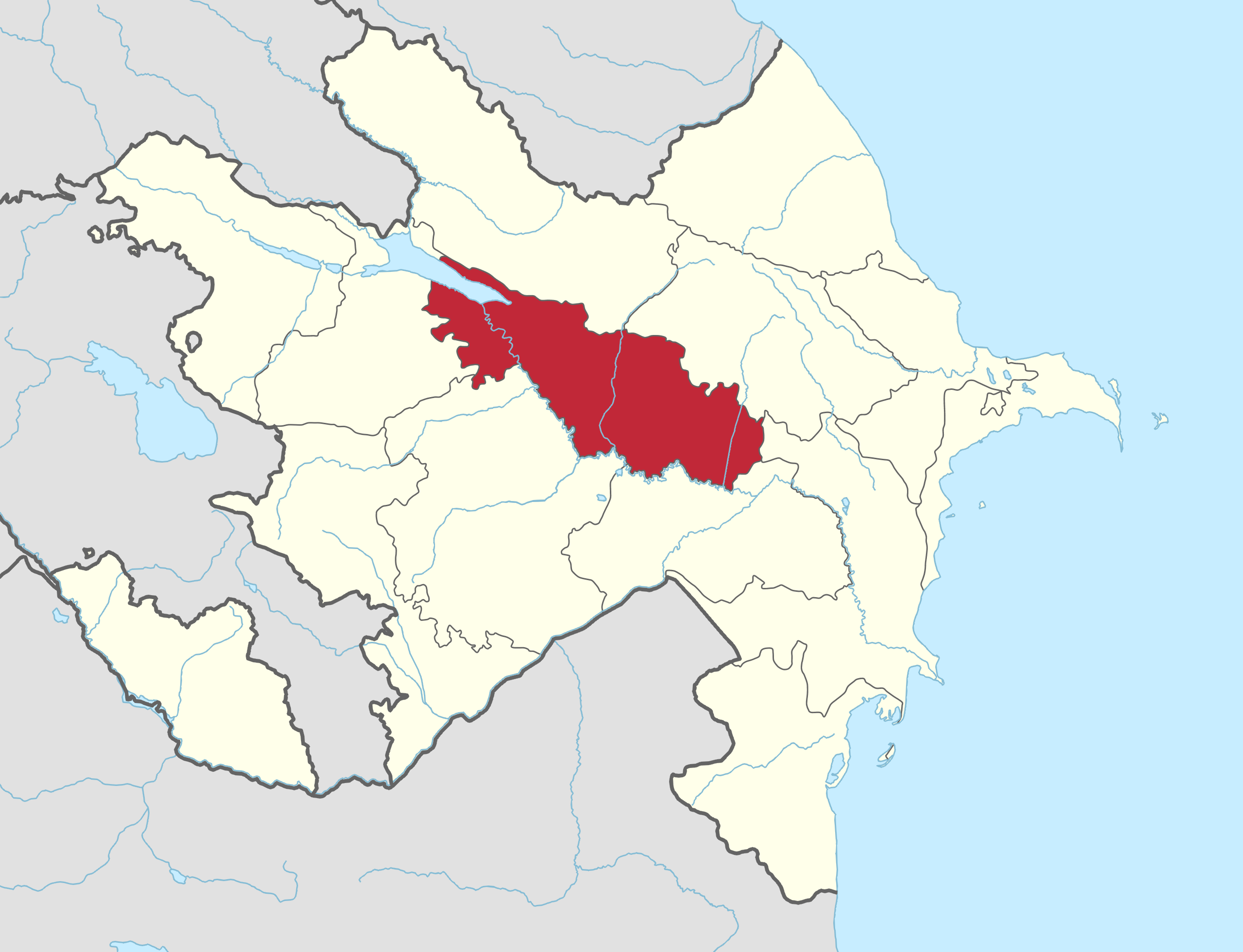
- Central Aran Economic Region in Azerbaijan
- Country: Azerbaijan
- Administrative regions: 8 (6 districts, 2 cities)
- Established: 7 July 2021
- Regional center: Yevlakh
- Largest city: Mingachevir

Area
  - Total: 6,690 km^{2} (2,580 sq mi)
  - Rank: 7th

Population (1 January 2026)
  - Total: 727,600
  - Rank: 3rd
  - Density: 109/km^{2} (282/sq mi)

Central Aran Economic Region (Azerbaijani: Mərkəzi Aran iqtisadi rayonu) is one of the 14 economic regions of Azerbaijan. It borders the economic regions of Shaki-Zagatala, Mountainous Shirvan, Shirvan-Salyan, Mil-Mughan, Karabakh, and Ganja-Dashkasan. The region consists of the districts of Agdash, Goychay, Kurdamir, Ujar, Yevlakh, Zardab, as well as the city of Mingachevir. It has an area of 6,690 square kilometres (2,580 sq mi). Its population was estimated to be at 740 thousand people in January 2021.

== History ==
Central Aran Economic Region was established on 7 July 2021 as part of a reform of the economic region system of Azerbaijan. Its territory was part of the larger Aran Economic Region prior to 2021.
