= Lankaran-Astara Economic Region =

Economic region of Azerbaijan

Coordinates: 38°59′20″N 48°42′03.4″E

Lankaran-Astara Economic Region Lənkəran-Astara iqtisadi rayonu (Azerbaijani)
- İqtisadi rayon (Economic region)
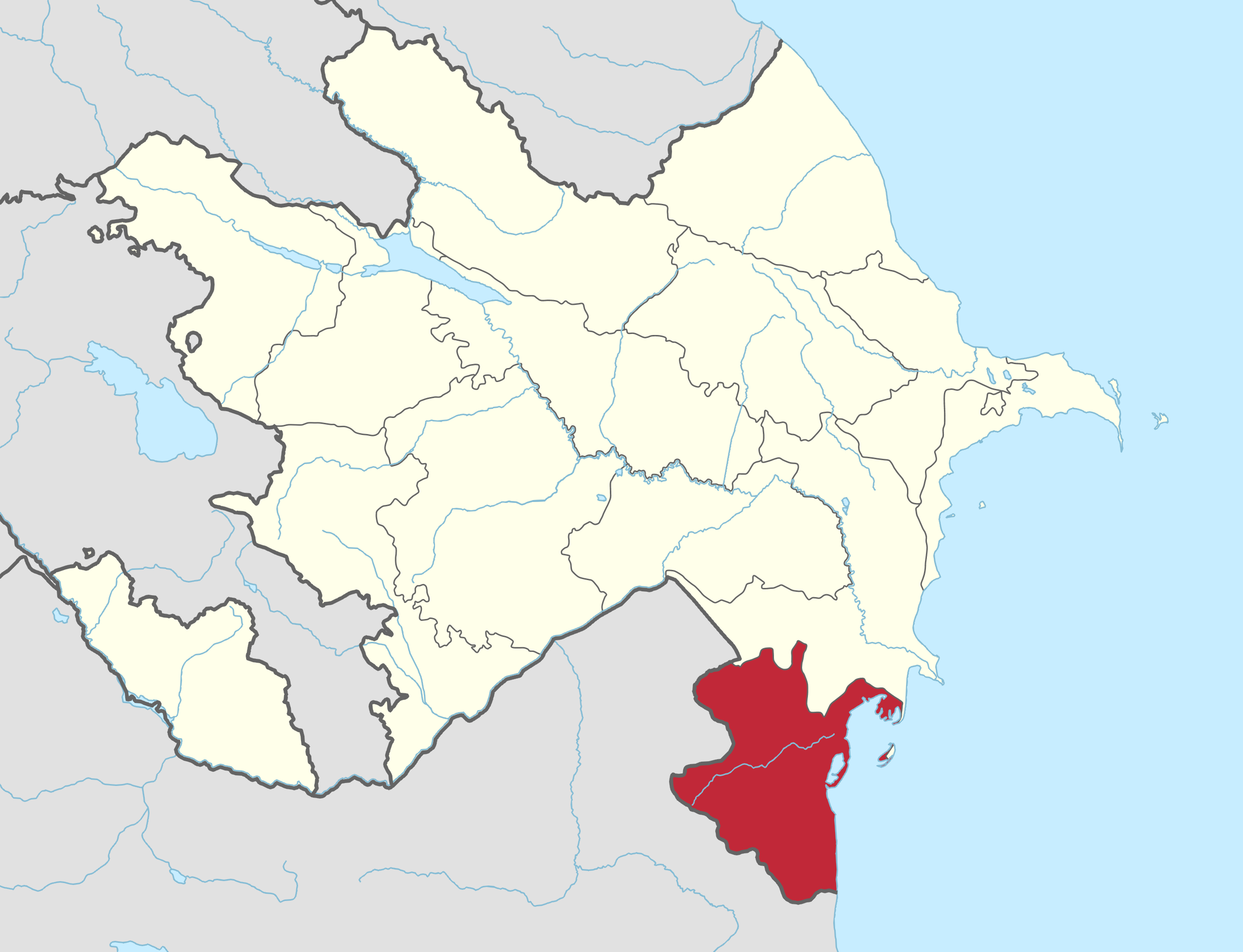
- Lankaran–Astara Economic Region in Azerbaijan
- Country: Azerbaijan
- Administrative divisions: 7 (6 districts, 1 city)
- Largest city and regional center: Lankaran

Area
  - Total: 6,070 km^{2} (2,340 sq mi)
  - Rank: 9th

Population (1 January 2026)
  - Total: 949,300
  - Rank: 5th
  - Density: 156/km^{2} (405/sq mi)
- HDI (2022): 0.718 high · 7th

Lankaran-Astara Economic Region (Azerbaijani: Lənkəran-Astara iqtisadi rayonu) is one of the 14 economic regions of Azerbaijan. It borders Iran to the south and west, Caspian Sea to the east and Shirvan-Salyan Economic Region to the north. The region consists of the districts of Jalilabad, Astara, Lerik, Lankaran, Masally and Yardimli. It has an area of 6,070 square kilometres (2,340 sq mi). Its population was estimated to be at 953.6 thousand people in January 2021.

== Administration ==
Within the 6 districts, there are 8 cities, 13 settlements, 642 villages and 182 municipalities in the Lankaran-Astara economic region. Each administrative district is headed by a chief executive appointed by the president of Azerbaijan. Heads of district executive powers are responsible for the establishment of representative offices of the executive power in the respective villages and settlements situated in their respective territories and appoint their representatives. Municipalities are divided into administrative-territorial units in districts and towns divided by settlements.

== Geography ==
The centre of the region is the city of Lankaran. The region covers an area of 6,070 square kilometers, which is 14.26% of the territory of the country. 26% of the territory is covered with forests and it's the wettest region in Azerbaijan. The region is characterized by damp subtropical climate and differs from other economic regions of Azerbaijan due to its natural conditions.

The area is divided into two parts, consisting of the Lankaran lowland and the Talysh mountains. The mountainous part of the economic region is composed of the Talysh, Peshtasar, and Burovar ranges.

Talysh Mountains in the western part and the proximity of the Lankaran lowland to the Caspian Sea provide a diverse climate in the Lankaran economic region. The summers are hot and mostly dry. The average July temperature is 24–26 °C and the absolute maximum temperature is 33–35 °C. The winters are very mild. The average January temperature is −2 to −4 °C, the absolute minimum temperature is −5 to −11 °C. The number of snowy days is between 10 and 30 days. Symptoms of subtropical climate gradually disappear in the areas where the rainfalls exceed 500 mm and the precipitation rises up to 400–600 mm, dry and hot summer dominates. In mountainous areas, summer is relatively cool; the average July temperature is 19–20 °C.

The region has a dense river network. The rivers of the district are fed mainly from rainwater. Several water reservoirs have been built on the rivers in order to supply the district with drinking and irrigation water. Khanbulanchay reservoir, which was built in 1977, is the region's largest water reservoir.

Lankaran economic region has diverse soil cover. In the Lankaran lowland, glacial-yellow soil is dominant. But the plains-foothill zone of the region is covered with forest soil. In the Talysh mountains, the brown mountain-forest and mountain meadowlands are spread. The brown mountain-forest lands are formed in dry and warm climates (total precipitation is 400 mm, the average annual temperature is 12 °C). These lands are spread in the mid-mountainous and foothill zone of the economic region at altitudes of 600–1200 m.

Yellow soils in Azerbaijan are spread only in the foothills of the economic region and occupy 157,100 hectares or 1.8% of all the region's lands. These lands are formed in the Mediterranean type of humid subtropical climate with an average annual temperature of 14 °C and an annual rainfall of 1300–1900 mm (south). Most of the rainfall occurs in the autumn and winter seasons. Yellow soils cover the Hirkan-type forests of chestnut oak trees.

== Demographics ==
As of 1 January 2012, the population of Lankaran economic region was 868,100. 24.9% of the population of the region lives in the cities, while 75.1% live in settlements and villages.

== Natural resources ==
The economic region is rich in natural resources such as sand, clay, gravel, gypsum, marble, as well as mineral water and forests. The region has a thick forest cover, with 25.3% of the forest area being in the territory of Astara, 24.4% being in Lerik and 20% being in the Lankaran administrative regions. Forests of the region are dominated by Parrotia persica, chestnut oak, silk acacia (Albizia julibrissin), etc.

There are up to 20 mineral springs in the Astara district. The water temperature of these springs is 35–50 °C. The composition of the springs such as Lankaran, Ashaghi Lankaran, Havzava, Nafthoni, Meshesu, Ibadisu, and others in the Lankaran administrative district is rich in sulfur and minerals that are important in healing. In the territory of Masally, Lerik, Yardimli administrative districts there are many mineral springs, which are used in treatment.

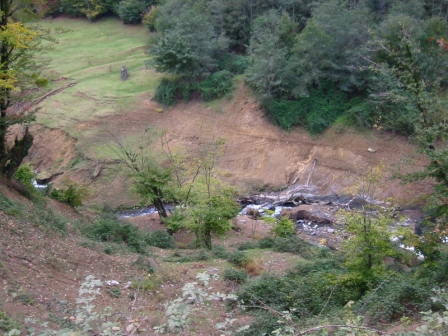
Lankaran, Hirkan National Park

The Gizilaghaj Reserve where different birds winter, the Hirkan National Park, and the Zuvand Reserve, which are rich in relic plants are located in the territory of the Lankaran economic region. The Ghizilaghaj State Reserve, established in 1929, spans 88,000 hectares. Different birds such as swans, geese, ducks, spoonbill, golden goose, and heron are protected in this reserve. The 2,900-hectare Hirkan National Park was established in 1936. There are mostly relic plants in the reserve – ironwood, chestnut oak, Caspian locust, azat tree, etc. The Zuvand Reserve is located in the territory of the Yardimli administrative district. The area of this reserve is 15,000 hectares, where the mountain goat is protected.

== Economy ==
=== Labor ===
Analysis of the main socio-economic indicators of the labor market in the Lankaran economic region shows that the number of employees in the region in the Lankaran economic region was 67,500 people. This is 6.1% more than in 2003.

=== Industry ===
The industry has a weaker position compared to agriculture in the Lankaran economic region. It is based on especially processing of local agricultural products. The food industry produces 90% of the industrial products of the region. There are some enterprises involved in the production of meat, milk, cheese, and bread. There are enterprises including construction material, furniture production, vehicle repair, instrument-making, maintenance, and repair of agricultural machinery. The poultry keeping industry is developed in Lankaran.

89.7% of the industrial output of the Lankaran economic region is produced in the Masally, Lankaran, and Astara regions.

=== Agriculture ===
The region has potential (humid subtropical climate, water for irrigation, fertile soil and labor force) to improve agriculture. Tea-growing is the main agricultural field in the region. Besides it, grain-growing, vegetable-growing, and vine-growing are the main sectors of agriculture. Lankaran economic region produces 99% of tea produced in the country. 27% of vegetables, 15% of grain, 24% of potato, 13% grape, 10% of the total number of fruits in Azerbaijan is produced Lankaran. Plain areas of Lankaran, Masally, and Astara are specialized in growing tea, and vegetables, as well as melon plantations. Jalilabad region is famous for its vine-growing. Grain-growing, tea-growing, and cattle-breeding are the main agricultural fields in Yardimli and Lerik. Especially growing citrus fruits is very improved in the region.

=== Investment ===
In the economic region, the volume of investments into the fixed capital in 2012 was 222.8 million manats. Between 2003 and 2010, the volume of the capital investments increased by 10.1 times compared to the previous years. Most of the investments in fixed capital (84.8%) were spent on construction works.

=== Transportation ===
Cargo and passenger transportation is carried out by Baku-Astara railway and Baku-Astara motorway. These ways also play an important role in economic relations between Azerbaijan and Iran.

In 2010, cargo turnover by motorway was 784.3 million tons, which is 14 times more than in 2003. A similar trend was observed in passenger turnover too.

=== Health ===
1,300 doctors and 3422 mid-level healthcare workers in all health care facilities are serving the population in the Lankaran economic region. 39 hospitals with 1846 beds, 181 outpatient clinics, as well as private stomatological polyclinics render service to the population.

=== Education ===
124616 pupils are enrolled in 566 schools operating in Lankaran economic region. A higher education institution in the region is Lankaran State University. A network of secondary schools, dramatic theatre, an ethnographic museum, and other social facilities operate in the region.
