= Ganja-Gazakh Economic Region =

Former economic region in Azerbaijan

- Economic region
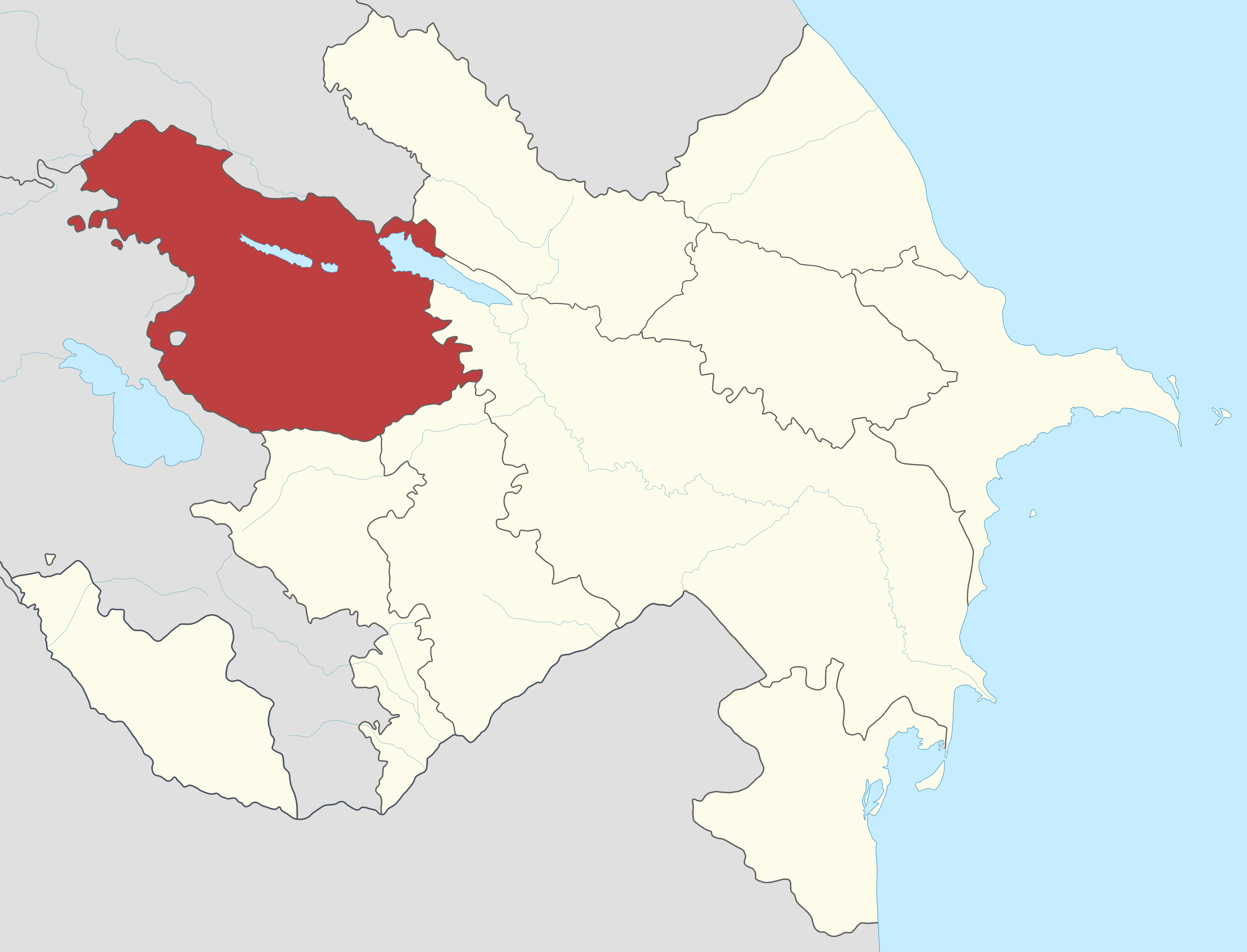
- Ganja-Gazakh Economic Region in Azerbaijan
- Abolished: 7 July 2021

The Ganja-Gazakh Economic Region was one of the 10 economic regions of Azerbaijan. It consisted of Aghstafa, Dashkasan, Gadabay, Goranboy, Goygol, Gazakh, Samukh, Shamkir, Tovuz administrative districts, as well as the cities of Ganja and Naftalan. The most developed and important city of Ganja-Gazakh economic region was Ganja city. The total population was 1,265,200 as of January 1, 2017, representing about 13.6% of the country's population. In the economic region, 47 percent of the population lived in urban areas, and 53 percent lived in rural areas. Population density 103 people per km^{2} of land area.

The region was abolished on 7 July 2021 and its territory was split among the newly created Ganja-Dashkasan and Gazakh-Tovuz economic regions.

== Agriculture ==
	2010	2012	2013	2014	2015	2016
Total area of sown agricultural crops (ha)
Cereals and cereal legumes	90265	95035	101972	94654	86111	91063
Including wheat	58865	59986	63695	61018	48887	53738
Cotton	889	1380	960	622	566	2354
Tobacco	-	-	-	-	-	38
Sugar beet	18	85	356	398	458	2054
Sunflower for seed production	3576	4953	4893	6260	5647	4816
Potato	31712	31022	31906	29828	29819	31163
Vegetables	12816	12321	12150	11906	11864	11852
Viticulture	1751	1039	1196	1084	968	1120
Fruit and berry	14405	14620	14774	14927	15399	15943
Grape	4071	4459	4081	4079	4263	4220
Productivity (in all categories of farming), ton
Cereals and cereal legumes	237706	297482	322418	264765	281760	277945
Including wheat	149053	184665	201316	166801	154236	163596
Cotton	1677	2568	1472	1093	419	4334
Tobacco	-	-	-	-	-	24
Sugar beet	57	1765	7803	11346	17241	76564
Sunflower for seed production	6977	10264	9811	10730	9738	9752
Potato	574834	564551	587014	453697	426535	454219
Vegetables	203179	201757	204067	199158	203119	218435
Viticulture	28020	16984	19985	18636	16973	20732
Fruit and berry	129204	138403	140972	134135	135917	138830
Grape	45458	52435	53704	55653	57257	56048
Productivity (in all categories of farming), centner / ha
Cereals and cereal legumes	26,3	31,3	31,6	28,1	32,7	30,3
Including wheat	25,3	30,8	31,6	27,5	31,6	30,4
Cotton	18,9	18,6	15,3	17,6	7,4	18,6
Tobacco	-	-	-	-	-	6,8
Sugar beet	32	211	224	301	396	417
Sunflower for seed production	20,0	21,1	20,7	17,6	17,8	21,1
Potato	181	182	184	152	143	146
Vegetables	152	157	159	158	163	171
Viticulture	160	164	167	172	175	186
Fruit and berry	101,8	106,0	106,1	100,4	100,6	97,9
Grape	103,6	121,2	120,7	126,9	129,3	125,5
Number of Livestock (in total)
cattle	322841	328581	330994	329301	329172	326581
including cow and buffalo	154303	156913	158176	156934	156281	156412
Sheep and goats	1736622	1740207	1745925	1741316	1736467	1714926
Pigs	76	185	643	207	147	123
Birds	2399809	2483108	2997419	3119063	2566803	2584876
Bee families	33434	34316	35431	36276	37107	39000
Production of animal products, ton
Meat	22536	24461	26154	27564	28287	29141
Milk	222702	248197	259982	266862	276848	293988
Eggs, thousand	110680	113036	175470	210888	152913	123213
Wool	3603	3725	3788	3841	3891	3446

== Demographics ==
The demographics of the economic region includes the demographic features of the population of the region including population growth, population density, economic status and other aspects. According to the population census data in 2017, urban population accounted for 47% and rural was 53%.

	2010	2012	2013	2014	2015	2016
Population
Population (by the end of the year, thousand people)	1191,7	1216,1	1227,5	1240,8	1253,4	1265,2
Natural increase	12474	11932	12015	13516	12630	11521
Birth	20649	20205	20366	21934	20971	20176
Death	8175	8273	8351	8418	8341	8655
Including:						
Children under the age of 1	213	186	182	162	159	129
Marriages	9732	9488	10717	11552	8754	8400
Divorces	954	1281	1343	1685	1877	1815
Per 1000 people
Natural increase	10,5	9,9	9,9	11,0	10,1	9,1
Birth	17,4	16,7	16,7	17,8	16,8	16,0
Death	6,9	6,8	6,8	6,8	6,7	6,9
Including;						
Children under the age of 1	10,2	9,3	9,1	8,1	7,5	7,0
Marriages	8,2	7,8	8,8	9,4	7,0	6,7
Divorces	0,8	1,1	1,1	1,4	1,5	1,4

== State programs ==
The State Program on socio-economic development of regions of Azerbaijan Republic (was approved by the Decree of the President of the Republic of Azerbaijan dated February 11, 2004) covered also the Ganja-Gazakh region and was aimed to ensure efficient use of internal resources, development of sectors that bearing particular importance for the economic region, further expansion of production activity of enterprises, stimulation of export-oriented production of goods, increase of employment levels through the development of local entrepreneurship, expand reforms in the agrarian sector and further improvements in the living standards of the population of the economic region. The program covered Aghstafa, Dashkesen, Gedebey, Goranboy, Goygol, Gazakh, Samukh, Shamkir, Tovuz districts and the cities of Ganja and Naftalan. “The state program for the development of tourism in the Republic of Azerbaijan between 2010 and 2014” tended to prepare recreational plans for recreational tourism resorts and sanatoriums (recreation-placement objects) in the economic region. In addition, the third state program on regional development (2014-2018) contributed to the improvement of the agriculture, tourism, housing and public utilities, transport and other sectors.

== See also ==
- Ganja, Azerbaijan
- Economy of Ganja
