= Karabakh Economic Region =

Economic region of Azerbaijan

Coordinates: 39°59′21″N 46°54′00.2″E

Karabakh Economic Region Qarabağ iqtisadi rayonu (Azerbaijani)
- İqtisadi rayon (Economic region)
- Karabakh Economic Region in Azerbaijan
- Country: Azerbaijan
- Administrative divisions: 8 (7 districts, 1 city)
- Established: 7 July 2021
- Largest city and regional center: Khankendi

Area
  - Total: 8,990 km^{2} (3,470 sq mi)
  - Rank: 1st

Population (1 January 2026)
  - Total: 751,100
  - Rank: 4st
  - Density: 83.5/km^{2} (216/sq mi)
- HDI (2022): 0.706 high · 9th

The Karabakh Economic Region (Azerbaijani: Qarabağ iqtisadi rayonu) is one of the 14 economic regions of Azerbaijan. It borders Iran to the south, as well as the economic regions of East Zangezur, Ganja-Dashkasan, Central Aran, and Mil-Mughan. The region consists of the districts of Aghjabadi, Aghdam, Aghdara, Barda, Fuzuli, Khojaly, Khojavend, Shusha, and Tartar, as well as the city of Khankendi . It has an area of 8,990 square kilometres (3,470 sq mi). Its population (including refugees and IDPs living outside the economic region in Azerbaijan) was estimated to be at 904.5 thousand people in January 2021.

== History ==
Karabakh Economic Region was established on 7 July 2021 as part of a reform of the economic region system of Azerbaijan. Its territory mostly corresponded to the Upper Karabakh Economic Region before 2021, which included the districts of Aghdam, Tartar, Khojavend, Khojaly, Shusha, Jabrayil, Fuzuli and the city of Khankendi.
