= Absheron-Khizi Economic Region =

Economic region of Azerbaijan

Coordinates: 40°31′32.4″N 49°30′01.9″E

Absheron-Khizi Economic Region Abşeron-Xızı iqtisadi rayonu (Azerbaijani)
- İqtisadi rayon (Economic region)
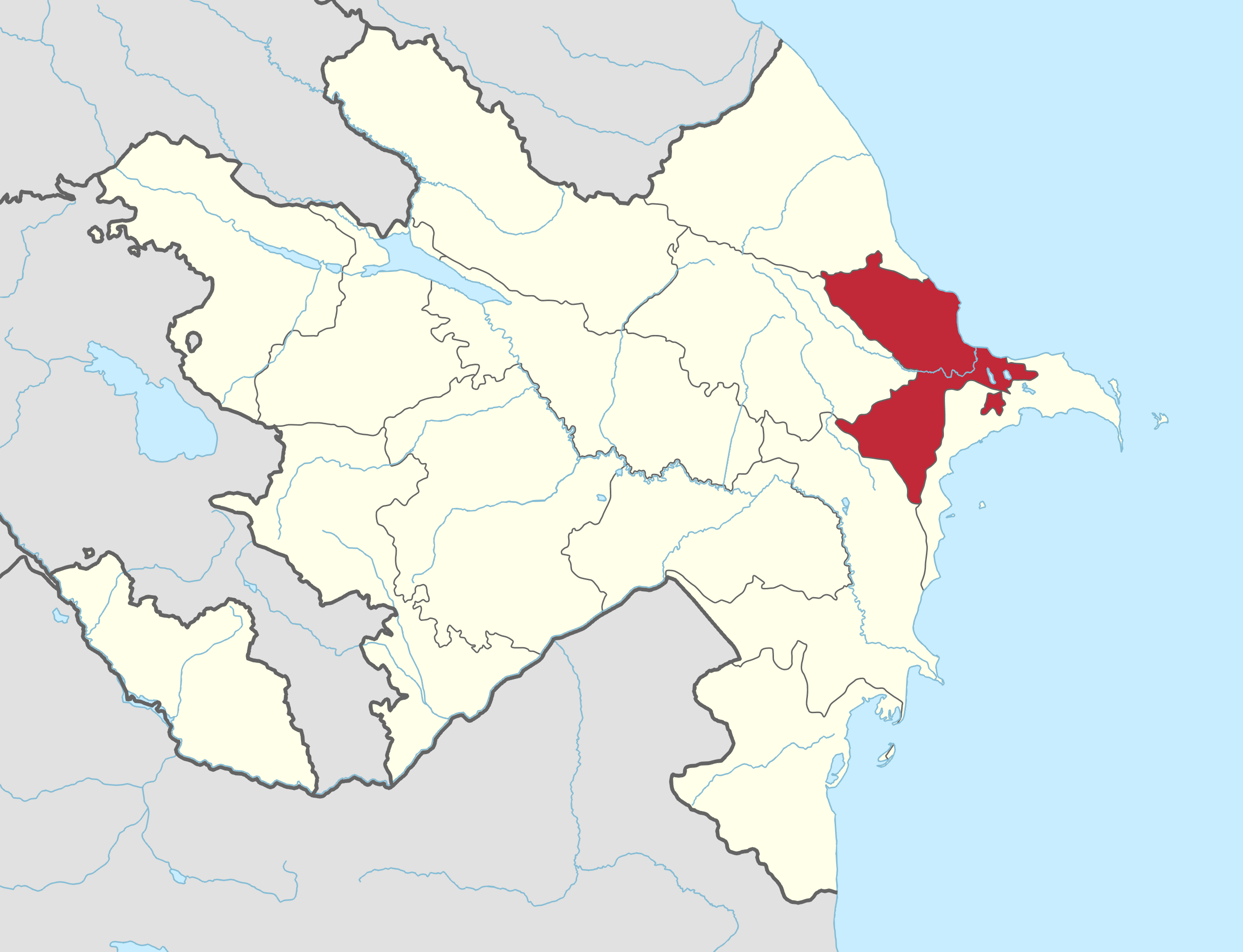
- Absheron-Khizi Economic Region in Azerbaijan
- Country: Azerbaijan
- Administrative divisions: 3 (2 districts, 1 city)
- Established: 7 July 2021
- Largest city and regional center: Sumgait

Area
  - Total: 3,730 km^{2} (1,440 sq mi)
  - Rank: 13th

Population (1 January 2026)
  - Total: 880,200
  - Rank: 8th
  - Density: 236/km^{2} (611/sq mi)

Absheron-Khizi Economic Region (Azerbaijani: Abşeron-Xızı iqtisadi rayonu) is one of the 14 economic regions of Azerbaijan. It borders the economic regions of Shirvan-Salyan, Mountainous Shirvan, Guba-Khachmaz, and Baku. The region consists of the districts of Absheron, Khizi and the city of Sumgait. It has an area of 3,730 square kilometres (1,440 sq mi). Its population was estimated to be at 578,800 people in January 2021.

== History ==
Absheron-Khizi Economic Region was established on 7 July 2021 as part of a reform of the economic region system of Azerbaijan. Its territory was part of the larger Absheron Economic Region prior to 2021.
