= Nakhchivan Economic Region =

Economic region of Azerbaijan

Coordinates: 39°17′40.4″N 45°25′54.5″E

Nakhchivan Economic Region Naxçıvan iqtisadi rayonu (Azerbaijani)
- İqtisadi rayon (Economic region)
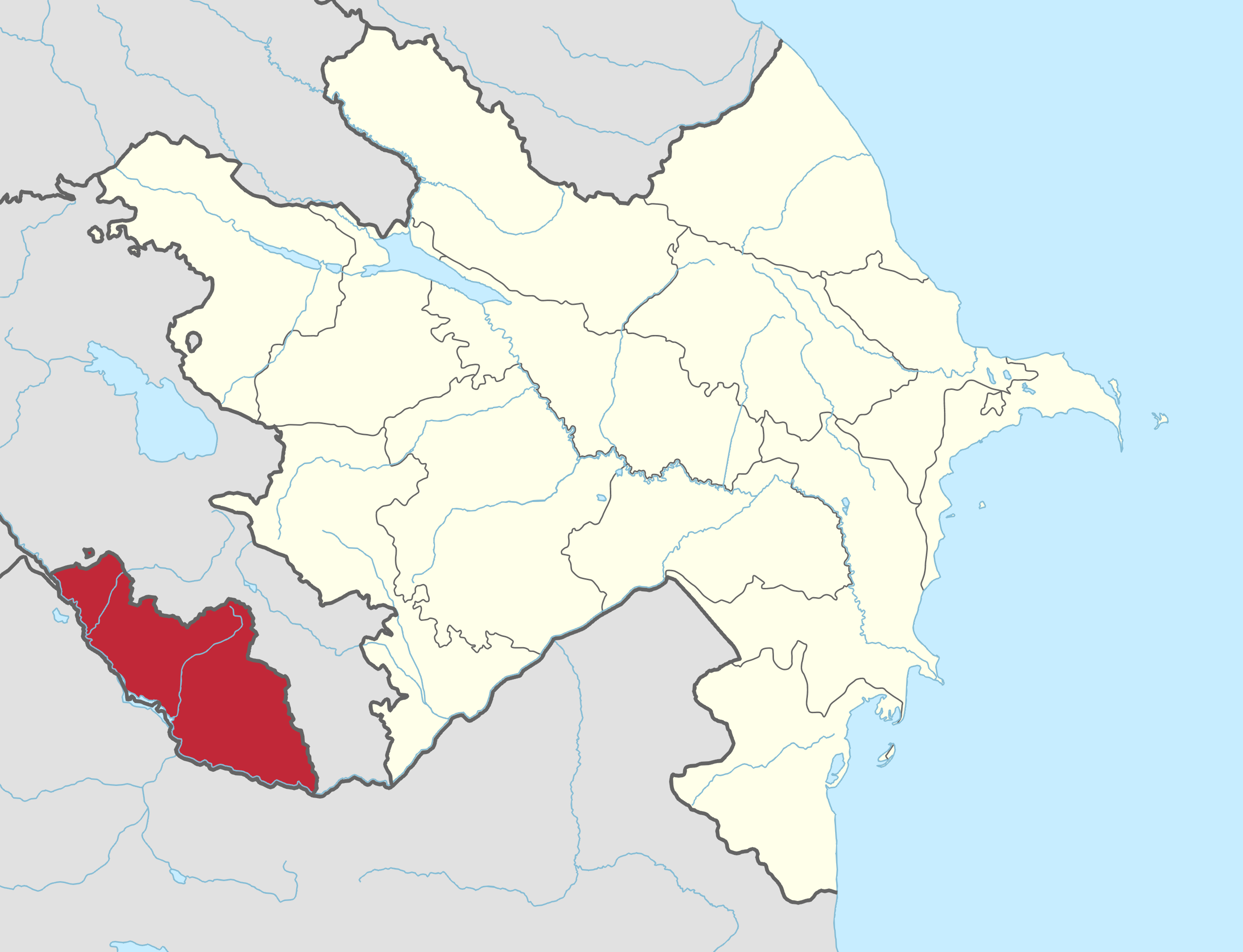
- Nakhchivan Economic Region in Azerbaijan
- Country: Azerbaijan
- Administrative divisions: 8 (7 districts, 1 city)
- Largest city and regional center: Nakhchivan

Area
  - Total: 5,500 km^{2} (2,100 sq mi)
  - Rank: 11th

Population (1 January 2026)
  - Total: 472,400
  - Rank: 12th
  - Density: 86/km^{2} (220/sq mi)

Nakhchivan Economic Region (Azerbaijani: Naxçıvan iqtisadi rayonu) is one of the 14 economic regions of Azerbaijan. It borders Iran to the south, Turkey to the west, and Armenia to the north and east. The region covers the Nakhchivan Autonomous Republic and consists of the districts of Babek, Julfa, Kangarli, Ordubad, Sadarak, Shahbuz, Sharur and the city of Nakhchivan. It has an area of 5,500 square kilometres (2,100 sq mi). Its population was estimated to be at 461.5 thousand people in January 2021.
