= East Zangezur Economic Region =

Economic region of Azerbaijan

Coordinates: 39°39′33.6″N 46°28′21.8″E

East Zangezur Economic Region Şərqi Zəngəzur iqtisadi rayonu (Azerbaijani)
- İqtisadi rayon (Economic region)
- East Zangezur Economic Region in Azerbaijan
- Country: Azerbaijan
- Administrative divisions: 5 districts
- Established: 7 July 2021
- Regional center: Jabrayil

Area
  - Total: 7,448 km^{2} (2,876 sq mi)
  - Rank: 3rd

Population (1 January 2026)
  - Total: 303,700
  - Rank: 13th
  - Density: 40.78/km^{2} (105.6/sq mi)
- HDI (2022): 0.706 high · 9th

The East Zangezur Economic Region (Azerbaijani: Şərqi Zəngəzur iqtisadi rayonu) is one of the 14 economic regions of Azerbaijan. It borders Iran to the south and Armenia to the west, as well as the economic regions of Karabakh, and Ganja-Dashkasan. The region consists of the districts of Kalbajar, Lachin, Qubadli, Zangilan, and Jabrayil. It has an area of 7,448 square kilometres (2,876 sq mi). Its population (the refugees and IDPs living outside the economic region in Azerbaijan) was estimated to be at 343.5 thousand people in January 2021.

== History ==
East Zangezur Economic Region was established on 7 July 2021 as part of a reform of the economic region system of Azerbaijan. Its territory mostly corresponded to the Kalbajar-Lachin Economic Region before 2021, which included the districts of all of its current districts, except Jabrayil.

According to researcher Laurence Broers, the region's new name, East Zangezur, is motivated by Azerbaijani irredentism; it borders Armenia's Syunik province, implying that there is a "Western Zangezur"—that is, Syunik itself. A few days after the Eastern Zangezur Economic region was created, Azerbaijani president Ilham Aliyev announced in a speech: "Western Zangezur is our ancestral land … we must return there, and we will return."
