= Baku Economic Region =

Economic region of Azerbaijan

Coordinates: 40°23′03.8″N 49°50′08.9″E

Baku Economic Region Bakı İqtisadi Rayonu (Azerbaijani)
- İqtisadi rayon (Economic region)
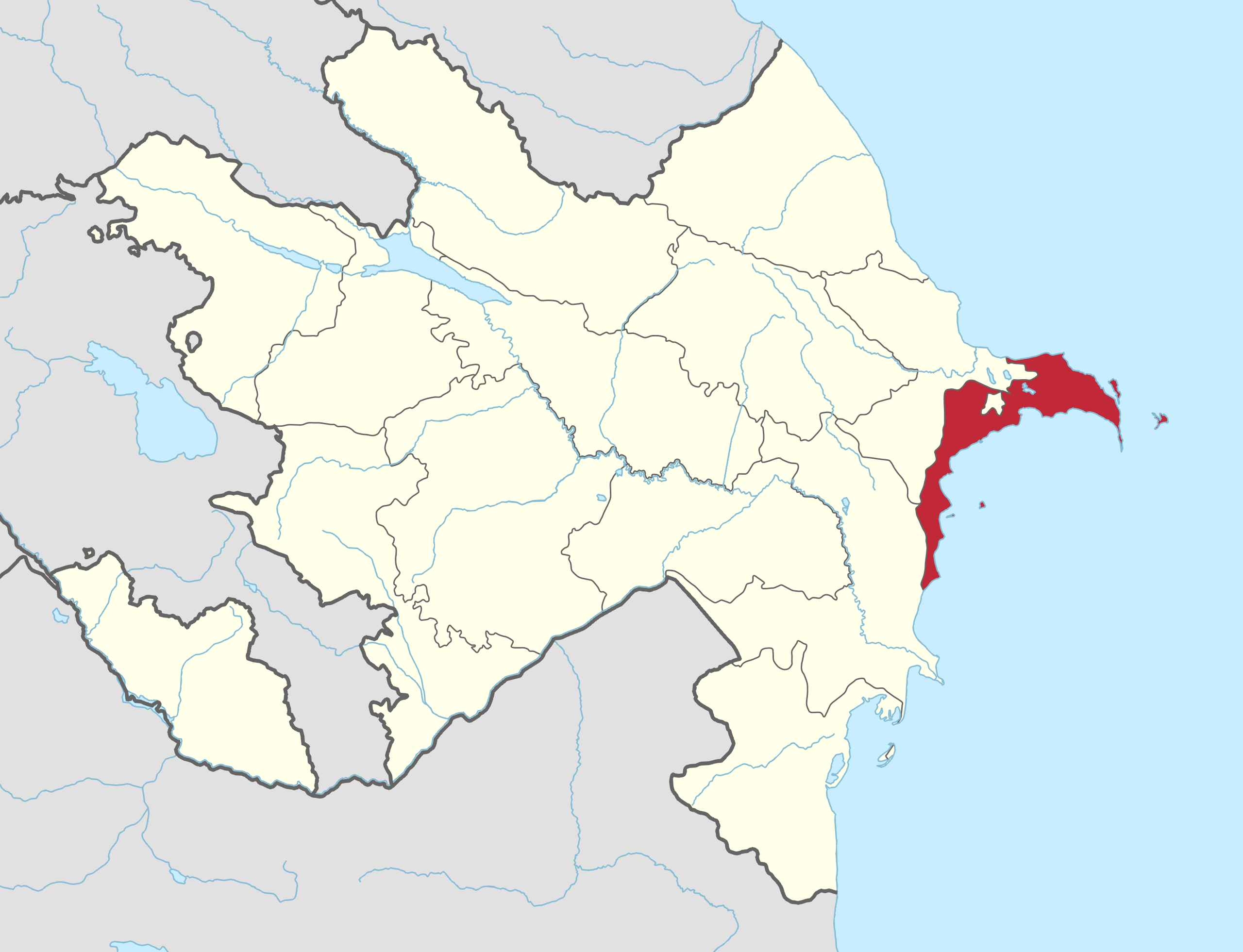
- Baku Economic Region in Azerbaijan
- Country: Azerbaijan
- Administrative divisions: 1 city (12 urban districts)
- Established: 7 July 2021
- Largest city and regional center: Baku

Area
  - Total: 2,140 km^{2} (830 sq mi)
  - Rank: 14th

Population (1 January 2026)
  - Total: 2,356,200
  - Rank: 1th
  - Density: 1,100/km^{2} (2,850/sq mi)

GDP (Nominal, 2023)
  - Total: AZN 91.2 billion (US$ 53.7 billion)
  - Per capita: AZN 38,912 (US$ 22,900)

Baku Economic Region (Azerbaijani: Bakı İqtisadi Rayonu (BİR)) is one of the 14 economic regions of Azerbaijan. It borders the economic region of Absheron-Khizi to the west and Caspian Sea to the east. The region consists of the city district of Baku, the capital of Azerbaijan. It has an area of 2,140 square kilometres (830 sq mi). Its population was estimated to be at 2.3 million people in January 2021.

== History ==
=== Established ===
Baku Economic Region was established on 7 July 2021 as part of a reform of the economic region system of Azerbaijan. Its territory was part of the larger Absheron Economic Region before 2021.

=== Antiquity ===
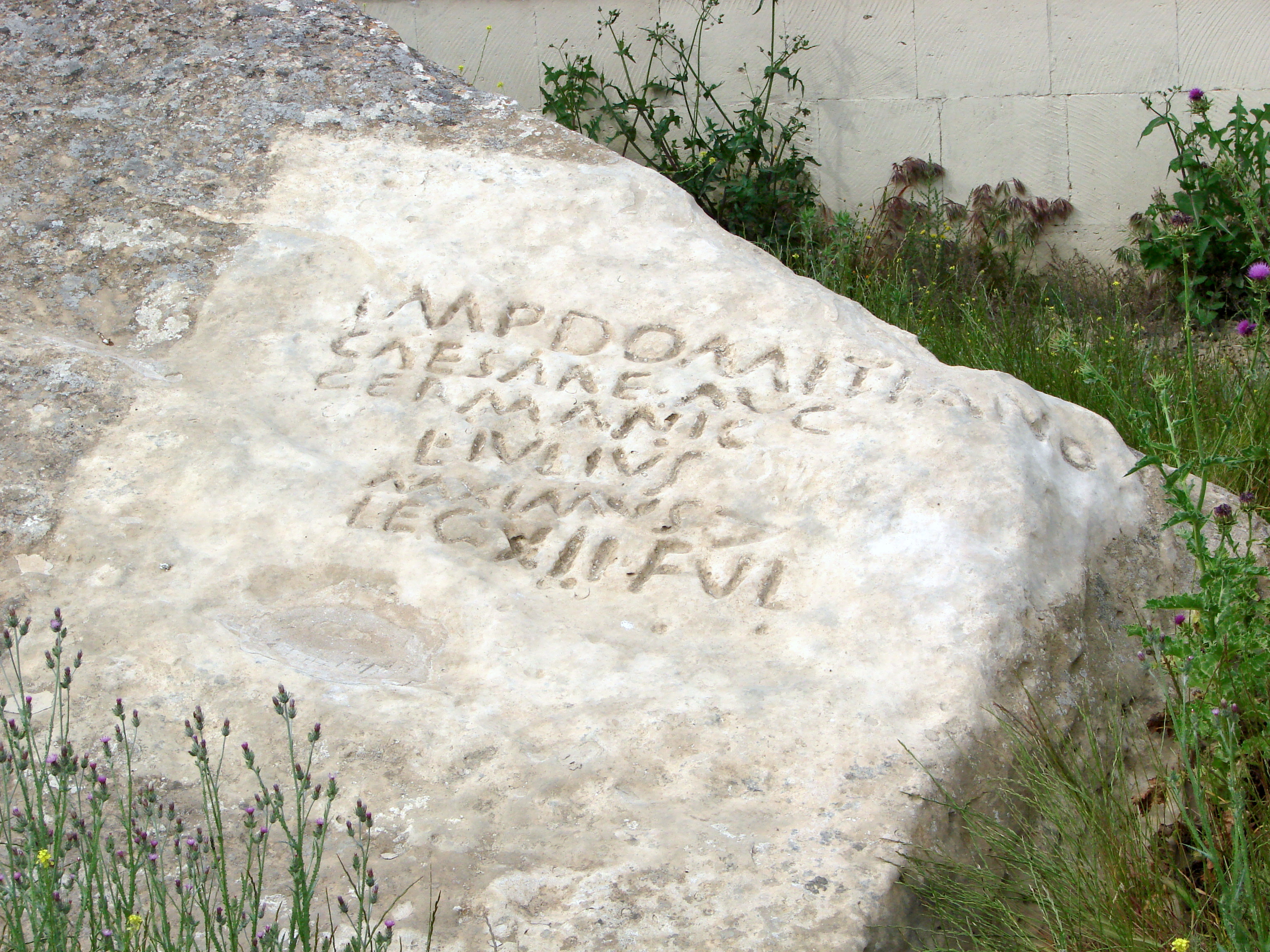
Roman stone inscription in Gobustan dating back to AD 84–96

Traces of human settlement in the region of present-day Baku date back to the Stone Age. Bronze-Age rock carvings have been discovered near Bayil, and a bronze figure of a small fish in the territory of the Old City. These have led some to suggest the existence of a Bronze-Age settlement within the city's territory. Near Nardaran, a place called Umid Gaya features a prehistoric observatory, where images of the sun and of various constellations are carved into rock together with a primitive astronomic table. Further archeological excavations have revealed various prehistoric settlements, native temples, statues and other artifacts within the territory of the modern city and around it.

In the 1st century AD, the Romans organised two Caucasian campaigns and reached what is today Baku. Near the city, in what is today Gobustan, Roman inscriptions dating from AD 84 to 96 survive – some of the earliest written evidences for a city there.

According to the 6th-century archbishop and historian St. Sophronius of Cyprus, in 71, St. Bartholomew the Apostle was preaching Christianity in the city of Albana or Albanopolis, associated with present-day Baku or Derbent, both located by the Caspian Sea. St. Bartholomew managed to convert even members of the local royal family who had worshipped the idol Astaroth, but was later martyred by being flayed alive and crucified head down on orders from the pagan king Astyages. The remains of St. Bartholomew were secretly transferred to Mesopotamia.
