= Guba-Khachmaz Economic Region =

Economic region of Azerbaijan

Coordinates: 41°20′42.4″N 48°31′56.7″E

Guba-Khachmaz Economic Region Quba-Xaçmaz iqtisadi rayonu (Azerbaijani)
- İqtisadi rayon (Economic region)
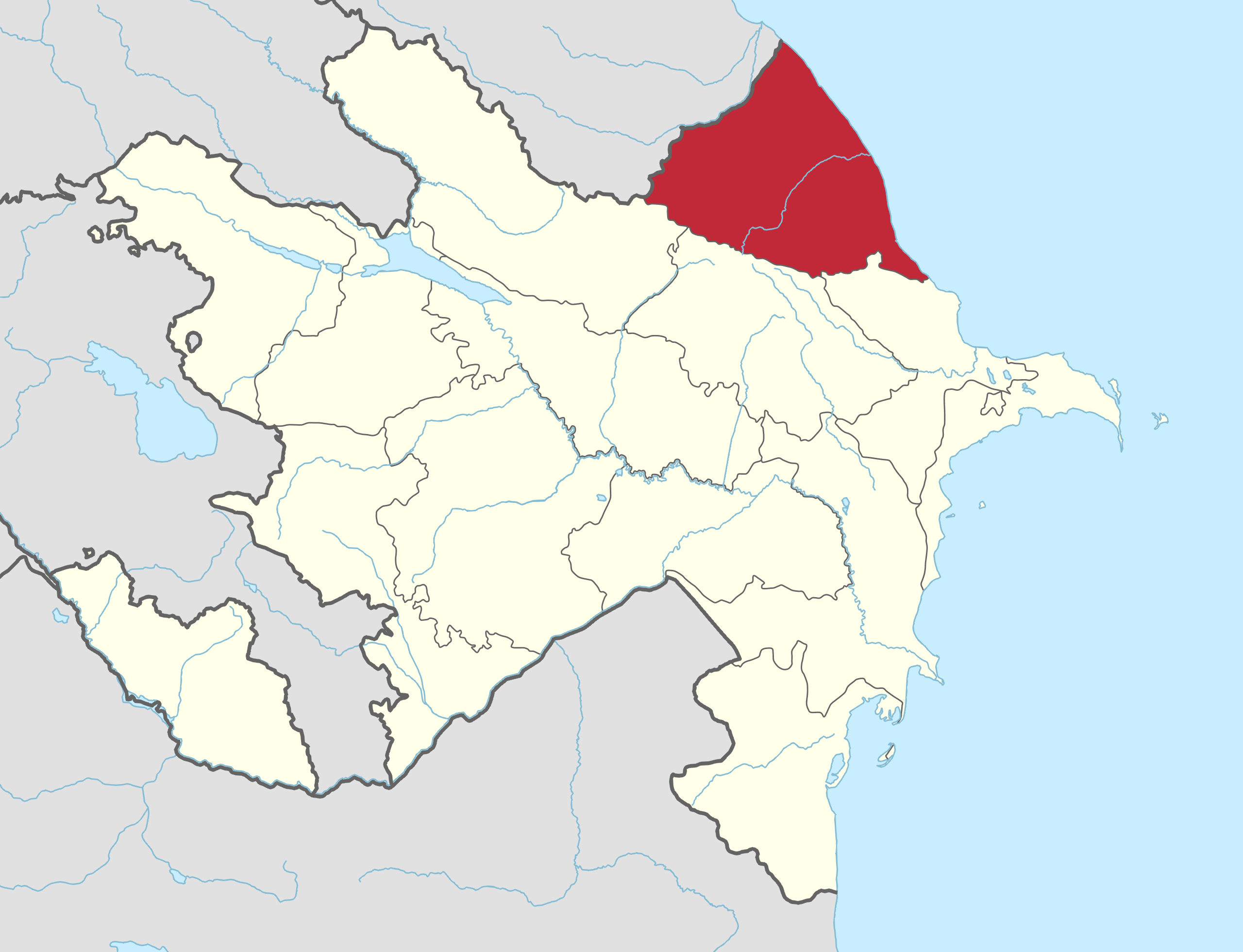
- Guba-Khachmaz Economic Region in Azerbaijan
- Country: Azerbaijan
- Administrative divisions: 5 districts
- Largest city and regional center: Quba

Area
  - Total: 6,960 km^{2} (2,690 sq mi)
  - Rank: 5th

Population (1 January 2026)
  - Total: 552,800
  - Rank: 9th
  - Density: 79.4/km^{2} (206/sq mi)
- HDI (2022): 0.738 high · 4th

Guba-Khachmaz Economic Region (Azerbaijani: Quba-Xaçmaz iqtisadi rayonu) is one of the 14 economic regions of Azerbaijan. It borders Russia to the north, as well as the economic regions of Shaki-Zagatala, Mountainous Shirvan, and Absheron-Khizi. It has an area of 6,960 square kilometres (2,690 sq mi). Its population was estimated to be at 558.7 thousand people in January 2021. The entire territory of the region falls into the geographically European part of Azerbaijan.

== Divisions ==
Administrative districts of the economic region include Shabran, Khachmaz, Guba, Gusar, and Siyazan.

== Geography ==
The territory of the region is 6,960 square kilometres (2,690 sq mi), 8.8% of the country. It is divided into four zones: plains, foothills, middle and high mountains. It is the only region of Azerbaijan alongside parts of Khizi District to be located within the European continent.

== Climate ==
The climate of the region has special topographic characteristic with four different zones. Clime types are divided into hot in the plain zones, cold-humid and cold in the mountain zones.

== Population ==
The total populations of Quba–Khachmaz economic region at the beginning of 2018 was 544,100 people.

Population distribution (in thousands)
Towns and regions	Total	including:		Urban places	including:		Rural places	including:	
Towns and regions	Total	men	women	Urban places	men	women	Rural places	men	women
Total	544.1	274.2	269.9	180.5	89.9	90.6	363.6	184.3	179.3
Qusar region	97.2	48.6	48.6	20.6	10.1	10.5	76.6	38.5	38.1
Qusar town	18.3	9.0	9.3	18.3	9.0	9.3	-	-	-
Samur settlement	2.3	1.1	1.2	2.3	1.1	1.2	-	-	-
Khachmaz region	176.3	88.4	87.9	67.6	33.3	34.3	108.7	55.1	53.6
Khachmaz town	41.9	20.6	21.3	41.9	20.6	21.3	-	-	-
Khudat town	16.7	8.3	8.4	16.7	8.3	8.4	-	-	-
Shollar settlement	0.2	0.1	0.1	0.2	0.1	0.1	-	-	-
Mukhdadir settlement	2.2	1.0	1.2	2.2	1.0	1.2	-	-	-
Ashaghi Lagar settlement	0.4	0.2	0.2	0.4	0.2	0.2	-	-	-
Shimal settlement	0.4	0.2	0.2	0.4	0.2	0.2	-	-	-
Dalgali settlement	0.2	0.1	0.1	0.2	0.1	0.1	-	-	-
Mesheli settlement	0.1	0.1	0.0	0.1	0.1	0.0	-	-	-
Samurchay settlement	0.1	0.0	0.1	0.1	0.0	0.1	-	-	-
Sahiller settlement	0.0	0.0	0.0	0.0	0.0	0.0	-	-	-
Guneshli settlement	0.0	0.0	0.0	0.0	0.0	0.0	-	-	-
Turist settlement	0.1	0.1	0.0	0.1	0.1	0.0	-	-	-
Arzu settlement	1.4	0.7	0.7	1.4	0.7	0.7	-	-	-
Yeni Hayat settlement	3.9	1.9	2.0	3.9	1.9	2.0	-	-	-
Quba region	170.0	86.4	83.6	40.4	20.3	20.1	129.6	66.1	63.5
Quba town	24.8	12.3	12.5	24.8	12.3	12.5	-	-	-
Qonaqkand settlement	1.8	0.9	0.9	1.8	0.9	0.9	-	-	-
Qirmizi Qasaba settlement	3.2	1.7	1.5	3.2	1.7	1.5	-	-	-
Ganjlar settlement	0.5	0.2	0.3	0.5	0.2	0.3	-	-	-
Zardabi settlement	4.5	2.3	2.2	4.5	2.3	2.2	-	-	-
Baghbanly settlement	1.9	1.0	0.9	1.9	1.0	0.9	-	-	-
Barly settlement	2.0	1.0	1.0	2.0	1.0	1.0	-	-	-
Garachay settlement	1.7	0.9	0.8	1.7	0.9	0.8	-	-	-
Shabran region	58.7	29.9	28.8	25.1	12.9	12.2	33.6	17.0	16.6
Shabran town	25.1	12.9	12.2	25.1	12.9	12.2	-	-	-
Siyazan region	41.9	20.9	21.0	26.8	13.3	13.5	15.1	7.6	7.5
Siyazan town	25.7	12.7	13.0	25.7	12.7	13.0	-	-	-
Gil-Gil chay settlement	1.1	0.6	0.5	1.1	0.6	0.5	-	-	-

== Natural resources ==
Natural resources of the economic region include oil, natural gas, gravel, sand, flammable shale, clay, and water resources.

Forests cover 10–11% of the region.

== Economy ==
Agriculture, industry, tourism, and folk art are the main areas of economy in region.

Economy of Quba-Khachmaz
	2013			2014		2015
	Number of enterprises	Output, 1000 manats	Number of enterprises	Output, 1000 manats	Number of enterprises	Output, 1000 manats
Total economy	13,306	117,834.7	9,107	126,770.8	9,496	138,086.0
of which natural persons – entrepreneurs	12,950	81,171.8	8,738	100,715.0	9,024	124,788.0
of which:						
agriculture, forestry and fishing	194	6,175.7	181	8,757.3	204	4,080.1
natural persons	108	1,035.0	83	1,004.0	83	1,061.0
industry	274	9,250.9	318	4,943.0	221	3,360.6
natural persons	230	2,078.7	272	2,421.4	169	2,894.5
construction	80	15,700.9	90	5,969.1	82	1,051.8
natural persons	63	429.0	71	394.8	62	323.7
trade; repair of transport means	10,204	44,970.6	5,165	50,745.0	5,495	80,055.1
natural persons	10,053	37,572.2	5,027	43,226.4	5,373	73,970.7
transportation and storage	1,137	14,635.2	1,150	25,995.0	1,168	16,555.8
natural persons	1,128	14,538.2	1,139	25,646.0	1,146	15,683.9
accommodation and food service	372	22,755.2	853	25,393.7	878	27,656.6
natural persons	361	21,709.4	837	24,185.4	857	26,984.3
information and communication	5	65.0	4	59.9	10	126.3
natural persons	-	-	-	-	-	-
real estate activities	11	29.3	28	169.4	28	196.5
natural persons	7	-	24	4.4	23	7.7
education	6	65.2	8	97.5	13	143.5
natural persons	-	-	-	-	-	-
human health and social work	1	6.4	2	18.5	8	343.2
natural persons	-	-	-	-	-	-
other fields	1,022	4,180.3	1,308	4,622.4	1,389	4,516.5
natural persons	1,000	3,809.3	1,285	3,832.6	1,311	3,862.2

=== Agriculture ===
In the coastal lowlands, grain and vegetable production is common, while the mountainous towns have orchards. Grape, potato and wheat are also main agricultural products. For milk and meat products, animals are raised in lowland areas. In Siyazan and Shabran districts, poultry is common.

=== Industry ===
Manufacturing industries heavily rely on oil and natural gas from Siyazan administrative district.

=== Tourism ===
Main touristic centers in the region are Yalama-Xudat sea shore, Qalaalti treatment center for kidney diseases, Quba, Qusar, and Khachmaz and Shabran for their hunting and fishing opportunities.

Tourism in Quba-Khachmaz
	2010	2012	2013	2014	2015	2016
Number of hotels	102	100	101	103	110	97
Total accommodation rooms	2,921	2,990	3,254	3,544	3,794	3,846
Instant attitude, place	7,905	8,119	8,703	9,127	9,691	9,572
Total accommodations persons	66,064	42,262	32,914	42,060	58,610	82,998
Total person-nights accommodations	310,094	279,439	194,871	227,364	195,719	219,552

=== Transportation and infrastructure ===
The region is serviced by railways and highways, oil, gas and water pipelines. The communication lines that connect Russia and Azerbaijan pass through this area. 7.4% of all railways of the republic pass through the territory of the district. The total length of roads in the economic region is 1,883 kilometres (1,170 mi), which is 7.9% of the total length of roads throughout the country.
