= Economic regions of Azerbaijan =

List of Azerbaijani economic divisions

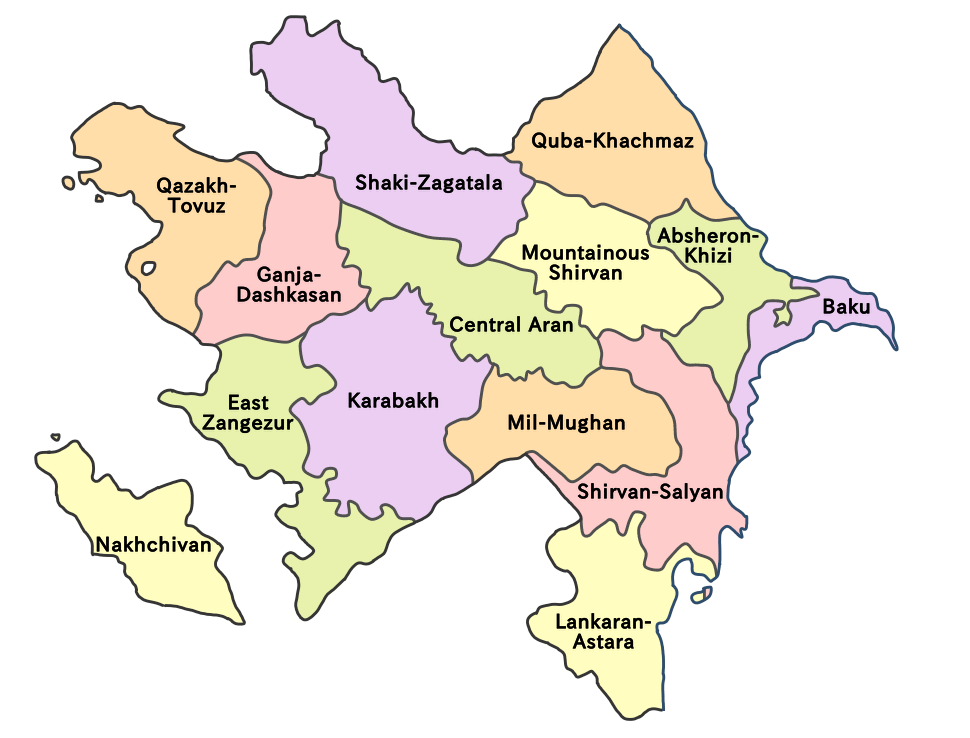
Map of economic regions of Azerbaijan (July 2021)

The Economic regions of Azerbaijan are 14 regions of the Republic of Azerbaijan characterized by a certain economic and geographical position, territorial and economic unity, the diversity of natural and economic conditions and industrial specialization.

=== Economic regions by area ===
Ranking of the economic regions of Azerbaijan by total area

Rank	Economic region	Total area (km²)	Total area (sq mi)
1	Karabakh Economic Region	8,844	3,415
2	Shaki-Zagatala Economic Region	8,842	3,414
3	East Zangezur Economic Region	7,436	2,871
4	Gazakh-Tovuz Economic Region	7,033	2,715
5	Guba-Khachmaz Economic Region	6,960	2,690
6	Mountainous Shirvan Economic Region	6,130	2,370
7	Central Aran Economic Region	6,129	2,366
8	Shirvan-Salyan Economic Region	6,079	2,347
9	Lankaran-Astara Economic Region	6,066	2,342
10	Mil-Mughan Economic Region	5,670	2,190
11	Nakhchivan Economic Region	5,500	2,100
12	Ganja-Dashkasan Economic Region	5,270	2,030
13	Absheron-Khizi Economic Region	3,730	1,440
14	Baku Economic Region	2,140	830

=== Economic regions by population ===
Rank	Economic region	Population (2026 est.)
1	Baku Economic Region	2,356,200
2	Lankaran-Astara Economic Region	949,300
3	Absheron-Khizi Economic Region	880,200
4	Karabakh Economic Region	751,100
5	Central Aran Economic Region	727,600
6	Gazakh-Tovuz Economic Region	683,000
7	Shaki-Zagatala Economic Region	630,900
8	Ganja-Dashkasan Economic Region	600,400
9	Guba-Khachmaz Economic Region	552,800
10	Mil-Mughan Economic Region	530,500
11	Shirvan-Salyan Economic Region	499,800
12	Nakhchivan Economic Region	472,400
13	Mountainous Shirvan Economic Region	324,500
14	East Zangezur Economic Region	303,700

== List of the regions ==
The territory of Azerbaijan was divided into 10 economic districts prior to 2021. On July 7, 2021, the President of Azerbaijan Ilham Aliyev signed Decree "On the new division of economic regions in the Republic of Azerbaijan", which abolished some of the former regions and created new ones. There are 14 economic districts of Azerbaijan as of 2025.

Economic region	Total area (km^{2})	Population (2021, thousands)	Population density (2021, people per km^{2})	Description
Baku	2,140	2,300.5	1,075	Includes Baku itself; it is the country's economic centre. Main industries: international trade, oil refining, chemical, machine-building, food, and textiles. The military, high-tech, and information technology industries are also developing.
Absheron-Khizi	3,730	578.8	155	Includes the Absheron and Khizi districts and Sumgait city. The main industries are petrochemical, chemical, metallurgy, energy, mechanical and electrical engineering, food, construction, and transport infrastructure.
Ganja-Dashkasan	5,270	611.3	116	Includes the Dashkasan, Goranboy, Goygol, and Samukh districts and the cities of Ganja and Naftalan.
Shaki-Zagatala	8,840	630.4	71	Includes the Balakan, Qakh, Qabala, Oghuz, Zagatala, and Shaki districts. The main industries are light industry, tourism and food.
Lankaran-Astara	6,070	953.6	157	Includes the Astara, Jalilabad, Lerik, Yardimli, Lankaran, and Masally districts. The main industries are food and tourism.
Guba-Khachmaz	6,960	558.7	80	Includes the Shabran, Khachmaz, Guba, Qusar, and Siyazan districts. The main industries are agriculture, light industry, tourism, and food.
Central Aran	6,690	740	111	Includes the Aghdash, Goychay, Kurdamir, Ujar, Yevlakh, and Zardab districts, and Mingachevir city.
Karabakh	8,990	904.5	101	Includes the Agjabadi, Aghdam, Barda, Fuzuli, Khojaly, Khojavend, Shusha, and Tartar districts and Khankendi (Stepanakert) city.
East Zangezur	7,470	343.5	46	Includes the Jabrayil, Kalbajar, Qubadli, Lachin, and Zangilan districts.
Mountainous Shirvan	6,130	324.8	53	Includes the Agsu, Ismayilli, Gobustan, and Shamakhi districts. The main industries are light industry and food.
Nakhchivan	5,500	461.5	84	Includes the whole territory of the Nakhchivan Autonomous Republic. The main industries are light industry, auto, and food.
Gazakh-Tovuz	7,030	687.6	98	Includes the Aghstafa, Gadabay, Gazakh, Shamkir, and Tovuz districts.
Mil-Mughan	5,670	522.6	92	Includes the Beylagan, Imishli, Saatly, and Sabirabad districts.
Shirvan-Salyan	6,080	501.3	82	Includes the Bilasuvar, Hajigabul, Neftchala, and Salyan districts, and Shirvan city.
Total	86,570	9,593	110.8	

== See also ==
- Administrative divisions of Azerbaijan
