= Shaki-Zagatala Economic Region =

Economic region of Azerbaijan

Coordinates: 41°32′57.3″N 46°42′11.6″E

Shaki-Zagatala Economic Region Şəki-Zaqatala iqtisadi rayonu (Azerbaijani)
- İqtisadi rayon (Economic region)
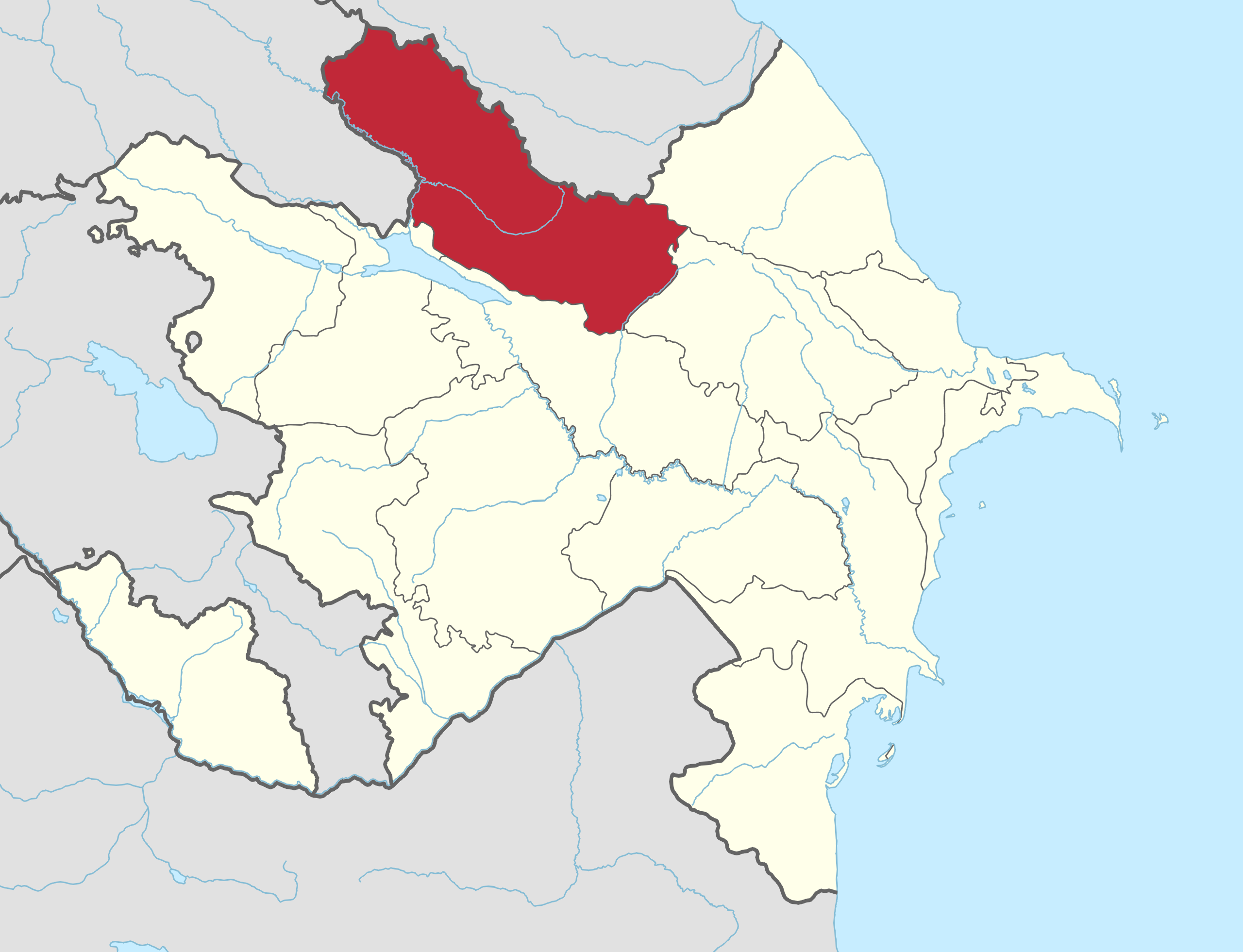
- Shaki-Zagatala Economic Region in Azerbaijan
- Country: Azerbaijan
- Administrative divisions: 7 (6 districts, 1 city)
- Largest city and regional center: Shaki

Area
  - Total: 8,840 km^{2} (3,410 sq mi)
  - Rank: 2nd

Population (1 January 2026)
  - Total: 630,900
  - Rank: 6th
  - Density: 71.4/km^{2} (185/sq mi)
- HDI (2022): 0.766 high · 3rd

Shaki-Zagatala Economic Region (Azerbaijani: Şəki-Zaqatala iqtisadi rayonu) is one of the 14 economic regions of Azerbaijan. It borders Russia to the north and Georgia to the west, as well as the economic regions of Quba-Khachmaz, Mountainous Shirvan, Central Aran, and Ganja-Dashkasan. The region consists of the districts of Balakan, Zagatala, Gakh, Shaki, Oghuz and Qabala. It has an area of 8,840 square kilometres (3,410 sq mi). Its population was estimated to be at 630.4 thousand people in January 2021.

== Geography ==
Shaki-Zagatala has an area of 8,840 square kilometres (2,180,000 acres).

The territory is divided into three parts: the southern slope of Greater Caucasus, the Ganikh-Haftaran Valley and the Central Kur Highland (Ajinohur and Turud-Sarica plain, the mountainous part of Shaki). The altitude ranges from 100 to 466100–466 metres (328–1,529 ft), the peak of Mount Bazardüzü, which is the tallest mountain in Azerbaijan and Russia.

=== Rivers and lakes ===
The region includes the following important rivers: Kish, Shin, Balakanchay, Katekh, Damiraparan, Mazım, Mukhakh, Ganikh, Ayrichay, Alijan and Turyan. Rich sources of thermal and mineral waters are available at Oghlanbulag, Gizbulag, Hamambulag, Budusshor, Aghbulag and Khalkhal. Nohur (Qabala) and Ajinohur (Gakh) are the major lakes.

=== Climate ===
The region gets 2,200-2,400 hours of sunlight annually. According to the median temperature in the coldest months, the winters in the area vary between mild (0;-5 C) and extremely mild (5-2.5 C). Feasible evaporation in the warm months (April–October) is around 400–1000 mm. The number of days without precipitation ranges between 5 and 25 days in June–September. The frost-free period extends for 150–250 days or more, while the number of days with below freezing temperatures is 20–150. Days with snow cover fluctuate between 20 and 120. At altitudes of 500–700 metres (1,600–2,300 ft) the climate is subtropical, while at higher elevations it is mild and cool; the climate becomes colder with increasing altitude. The region holds second place after the Lankaran-Astara zone for the range of annual rainfall amounts.

=== Land cover and biodiversity ===
The most common landscapes are meadows, mountains and forest areas, with a range of forest and mountain soils. The area is characterized by a diverse landscape, more densely forested than other regions of Azerbaijan. Alder (Alnus sp.) Caucasian wing nut (Pterocarya pterocarpa), hybrid poplar (Populus), and long-stem oak (Quercus longipes) are all dominant species of trees in flatland forests. Forests of juniper (Juniperus sp.), Turkish terebinth (Pistacia sp.) and Iberian oak (Quercus iberica) occupy the steppe plateau areas. The dominant flora of the down mountain forest zone (1,000–1,100 metres (3,300–3,600 ft)) are Iberian oak and eastern hornbeam (Carpinus orientalis). The middle mountain forest zone mainly consists of beech (Fagus sp.) forests. The fauna of the region is characterized by mammals such as the brown bear (Ursus arctos).

=== Natural resources ===
The region is rich in minerals. Most of the copper reserves of Azerbaijan, 90 percent of the sulfur arthroplasty, 97 percent of lead, 99 percent of sinks are extracting in this region. Filizchay, one of the largest polymetallic deposits in the Caucasus region, is located in the region. There are gravel, sand and other building material resources in mountainous and foothills. About 27 percent of the Shaki-Zagatala economic region is forested. The majority of them are in the territory of Balakan and Zagatala. The economic region has rich water resources. There are 9 underground water reservoirs in the region.

=== Demography ===
As of January 1, 2018, the population of the Shaki-Zagatala economic region was 621,400. or 6.2% of the country's population. 27.6% of the population of the economic region live in the cities, while 72.4% live in rural areas.

== Economy ==
The region's economy is based on agriculture. According to the countrywide division of labor on agricultural products, the Shaki-Zagatala economic-geographical region is represented by tobacco growing, sericulture, tea cultivation, floriculture, paddy cultivation, fruit cultivation, grain cultivation, viticulture, sheep breeding.

More than 75% of tobacco, 17% of grain, 35% of barley, and 2% of green tea-leaf in Azerbaijan are produced in this economic region. The production of livestock products in the Shaki-Zagatala economic region constitutes more than 10% of these products throughout the country.

The industry of the Shaki-Zagatala economic region is relatively weak and unilaterally developed.

Only 3% of the country's industrial product falls into this region's share. The industry of the economic region is mainly specialized in the light and food industries, which process agricultural products. These areas produce more than 95% of the industrial production of the economic region. The food industry is mainly developed in horticulture, tobacco and livestock products processing. Shaki food factories and wine factories, Gabala, Gakh, Balaken, Nij fruit and vegetable canning plants, Zagatala hazelnut and rose oil plants, tea factory, and Shaki meat factory are the main enterprises of the food industry. In addition, small businesses that produce domestic bakeries, eastern sweets and non-alcoholic beverages are also operating in the economic region. The light industry is based on sericulture. There are various sewing industry enterprises in all rayon centres in the region. Tobacco fermentation plants are operating in Shaki, Gabala, Balaken and Zagatala. Other sectors of the industry of the region include the Zagatala furniture factory, the brick plant, the Balakan field enterprise, etc.

The nature allows the region to be one of the major recreation and tourism regions in Azerbaijan. Recreational tourism enterprises operate in Gabala, Shaki and Zagatala.

== Transport ==
The transport network of the Shaki-Zagatala economic-geographical region consists of railways and highways, partly airways and pipelines. The region is located on the Yevlakh-Balaken railroad and highways. This railway was commissioned in 1986. About 20-25% of cargo and 12-15% of passengers are transported with this railway. The railway runs mainly through four administrative regions (Shaki, Zagatala, Gakh and Balakan). 62 km or 38% of the railway line is passing through Shaki, 38 km or 24% Zagatala, 40 km or 24.5% Gakh, 22 km- i or 13.5% Balakan region.

=== Highways ===
Baku-Yevlakh-Balaken and parallel to it Baku-Ismayilli-Gabala-Balakan highways occupy an important place in the region. The total length of roads in the region is 1,921 km. The international significance of the Balakən-Lagodekhi highway (the continuation of the Yevlakh-Balakan highway) has increased since Azerbaijan gained independence. The economic-geographical region joins the South Caucasus and TRACECA transport network with this highway.

Only 11% of the roads are covered with asphalt in the economic-geographical region. At the same time, gravel roads constitute 55%, and ground rods 8% of total roads.

=== Air transport ===
During the Soviet period, regular flights from Baku to Zagatala and Shaki were flying. At the same time, airports were used for sanitary aviation in other administrative regions of the region (Balakan, Gakh, Gabala).

In recent years, air transport has been revived in Shaki-Zagatala and in 2007 the new airport in Zagatala was put into operation. There is also an airport in Gabala. In addition to raising passenger traffic, they facilitate the arrival of tourists to the region.

=== Air transport ===
In the Soviet period, there were constant flights on the Baku-Zafatala, Baku Shaki routes. At the same time, airports were built for sanitary aviation in other administrative regions of the region such as Balaken, Gakh, and Gabala.

The air transport sector has been revived in Shaki-Zagatala economic region recently. In 2008 Zagatala international airport was opened. In 2009, after major reconstruction, airport in Zagatala was granted international status.
