= List of regions of Azerbaijan by Human Development Index =

This is a list of Azerbaijani regions by Human Development Index with 2024 data. HDI of Azerbaijan in 2024 was 0.789 according to United Nations Human Development Index Report.

Rank	Region	HDI (2023)
Very high human development
1	Baku	0.821
2	Absheron	0.808
High human development
–	Azerbaijan	0.789
3	Shaki-Zagatala	0.782
4	Ganja-Gazakh	0.782
5	Nakhchivan	0.779
6	Aran	0.765
7	Dakhlik-Shirvan	0.760
8	Guba-Khachmaz	0.757
9	Lankaran	0.755
10	Yukhari-Karabakh	0.746
	East Zangezur	N/D
