= Qobustan =

Qobustan or Gobustan may refer to:

- Gobustan District, Azerbaijan
- Qobustan (town), administrative center of Gobustan District, Azerbaijan
- Qobustan, Baku, a settlement and municipality in Azerbaijan
  - Gobustan State Historical and Cultural Reserve, World Heritage Site near Qobustan, Baku
- Qobustan, Absheron, a village in Azerbaijan
