= Həmyəli =

Həmyəli or Həmjəli or Gamiyaly or Gamyali may refer to:

- Həmyəli, Gobustan, Azerbaijan
- Həmyəli, Shamakhi, Azerbaijan
