= Jalil Javadov =

Soviet Azerbaijani admiral (1918–1980)

Jalil Javadov Cəlil Cavadov
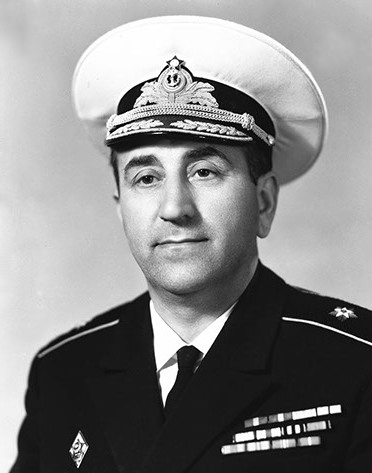
- Born: Cəlil Məmmədəli oğlu Cavadov; August 1, 1918; Fatmayi, Absheron, Azerbaijan Democratic Republic
- Died: February 6, 1980 (aged 61); Baku, Azerbaijan SSR, USSR (Now Baku, Azerbaijan)
- Spouse: Gulsum Baghirbeyova (1948–1980)
- Children: 4
- Military career
- Service years: 1937–1980
- Rank: Counter Admiral
- Conflicts: Great Patriotic War

Jalil Mammadali oghlu Javadov (Azerbaijani: Cəlil Məmmədəli oğlu Cavadov; 1 August 1918, Fatmayi, Absheron – 6 February 1980, Baku, Azerbaijan SSR) was a Soviet Azerbaijani commander, counter admiral (1968), first admiral of Azerbaijan and Turkic-muslim world of the USSR, chairman of Republic Committee of Army, Aviation, Volunteer Assistance Society of Azerbaijan SSR (1954–1971), member of the 5th convocation (1959–1963) of the Supreme Soviet of the Azerbaijan SSR.

== Biography ==
=== Early life ===
Jalil Mammadali oghlu Javadov was born on August 1, 1918, in the village of Fatmayi in Absheron. His father, Mammadali Javadov (1882–1946), was a resident of Fatmayi village and worked as a director at one of the companies of well-known oil millionaire and philanthropist Musa Nagiyev, and worked in the oil industry during the Soviet era. His mother, Hamida Javadova (1890–1929), was a housewife and a resident of Fatmayi village.

=== Education ===
Jalil Javadov graduated from Fatmayi village school in 1929, studied at the Chemical Engineering faculty of Industrial Technical School named after N.Narimanov in Baku in 1930–1935. After graduating from the technical school, he was employed as a technical chemist at AzNeft association. In 1936, after working for a year, he entered the Moscow University of Chemical Technology named after D.I.Mendeleev. In 1937 he was admitted into the Naval Academy named after P.N.Nakhimov in Sevastopol. Having successfully passed all the final exams, Cavadov was awarded the title of michman and was sent to a 6-month internship on March 18, 1941.

== Participation in the battles of Danube and Crimea ==
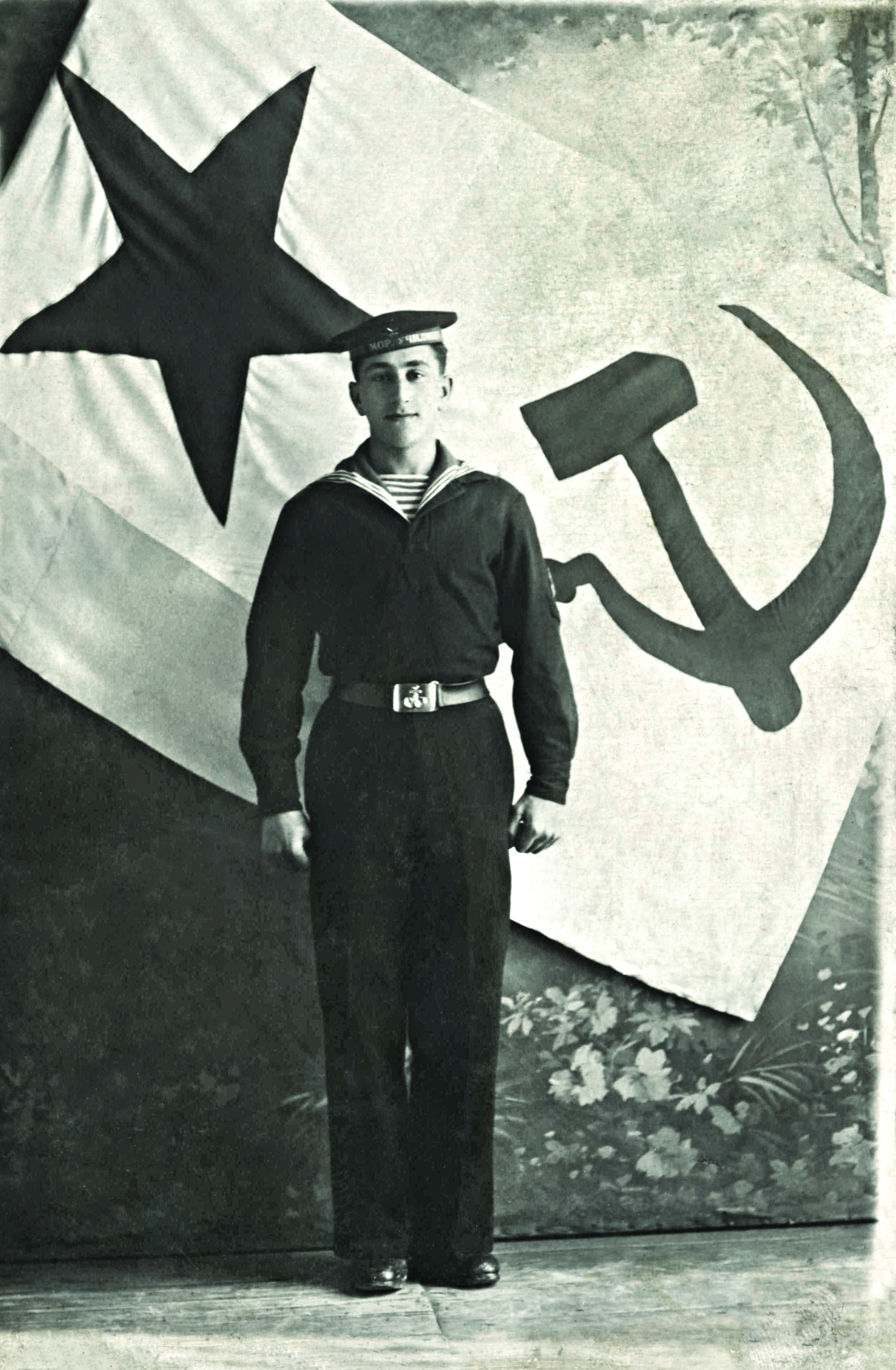
Jalil Javadon in 1941

Michman Javadov was appointed to the Danube Military Navy, the USSR's largest fleet. On June 22, 1941, on the first day of the Great Patriotic War, Javadov was at the battlefield at his armored boat, and he took an active part in battle of Danube. By the order of commissar of the USSR Military Navy J.Javadov was given military rank of lieutenant on June 24, 1941. On June 25, Javadov took part in landing troops in Satul-Nou spit, and took part in the capture of the city of Kiliya-Veke (Old Kiliya) on 26 June. During the operation, Javadov destroyed an observer station that corrected the fires of enemy artillery.

On August 12–15 Jalil Javadov's towing vessel took part in the evacuation of Nikolayev. August 15, the ship was in the port of Kherson. At the end of August Javadov took part in the evacuation of Kherson city.

Under the command of the DMN, Lieutenant Javadov was appointed commander of naval infantry division under the sea brigade in September 1941. Here he took part in battles for Kinburn Spit. In these battles lieutenant Javadov was wounded in his leg and was evacuated to Sevastopol.

On October 19, 1941, Lieutenant Javadov was appointed commander of the "Sea Hunter" MO-4 boat. The vehicle belonged to Conservation of Main Base Basin of Black Sea Fleet. As a result of his operations, six diving vessels of and over 20 divers of Black Sea Fleet were rescued from the city where was seized by the opponent forces.

Jalil Javadov's first badge was Medal "For Battle Merit". For participation and role in the battle for Sevastopol he was awarded the second medal of honor - Medal "For the Defence of Sevastopol".

=== Participation in battle for defense of Caucasus ===
Lieutenant Jalil Javadov was appointed commander of a trawl launch, which was a part of 12th trawl boats. The main objective of these boats was to combat enemy mines. However, Javadov's launch was also used for air escort, warning and communication, and for other purposes. On February 4, 1943, Javadov's boat took part in landing troops in Southern Ozereika. Javadov approached two burning Soviet boats rescued their crew. Lieutenant Jalil Javadov was awarded the Medal "For the Defence of the Caucasus" for active participation in combat operations in the Caucasus.

=== Participation in battles in the Northern Fleet ===
On February 11, 1943, Javadov was sent to take a course, by the order of the People's Commissar of the Military Maritime Fleet of the Soviet Union. After completing the course, Lieutenant Jalil Javadov was appointed commander of the "Little Hunter" launch in the Northern Fleet on the order of the People's Commissar of the USSR MMF on August 4, 1943. At the end of 1943, Lieutenant Javadov's boat was included in the division of "small hunters", which was a base of Northern Fleet in the city of Polyarny. In the Barents Sea, Javadov's boat faced a guard ship. Javadov's boat did not only managed to expel the enemy, but also welcomed the Soviet submarine into the port. During another duty, Javadov's boat drove the opponent submarine tanker out, then greeted the Soviet underwater boat and crossed the port.

In 1944, Javadov's boat was involved in the operations in the Kara Sea. By order of the People's Commissar of the USSR MMF, Jalil Javadov was awarded the title of Senior lieutenant on March 16, 1944. In the spring of 1944, he became a member of the Communist Party of the Soviet Union. In October 1944 Javadov's boat participated in landing troops in Liinakhamari (October 12–14, 1944), one of the successful operations of the Soviet Navy.

== Participation in battles in Danube ==
At the end of March 1945, Javadov was appointed to the reshaped Danube Military Fleet. He was chosen commander of the armored on the order of the People's Commissar of the USSR MMF on April 4, 1945.

In early April 1945, Javadov took part in the liberation of Komárno city of Slovakia. He also took an active part in the battles for Bratislava. In the vicinity of the Vienna, Javadov's role was more notable. He found a way to reach Vienna, as vessels of fleet used it to enter the city. The landmark of battle for Vienna took place on April 11, 1945. Vienna was liberated on the night of April 14. In one of the raids, Javadov destroyed a German guard ship.

On October 25, 1945, Jalil Javadov was awarded with the Order of the Red Star for the exemplary fulfillment of the commander's combat assignments and display of courage at war with German forces. Jalil Javadov was awarded the Medal Medal "For the Victory over Germany in the Great Patriotic War 1941–1945" on decree of the Presidium of the Supreme Soviet of the Soviet Union dated May 9, 1945. During this period, a presentation was made on the awarding of Javadov with the second Order of the Red Star, but the document was probably lost and the order was given to him only in 1953. His work on demining Danube mine was rewarded. On June 6, 1945, Javadov was honored with the Medal "For Valiant Labour in the Great Patriotic War 1941–1945".

== Service in the Caspian Sea ==
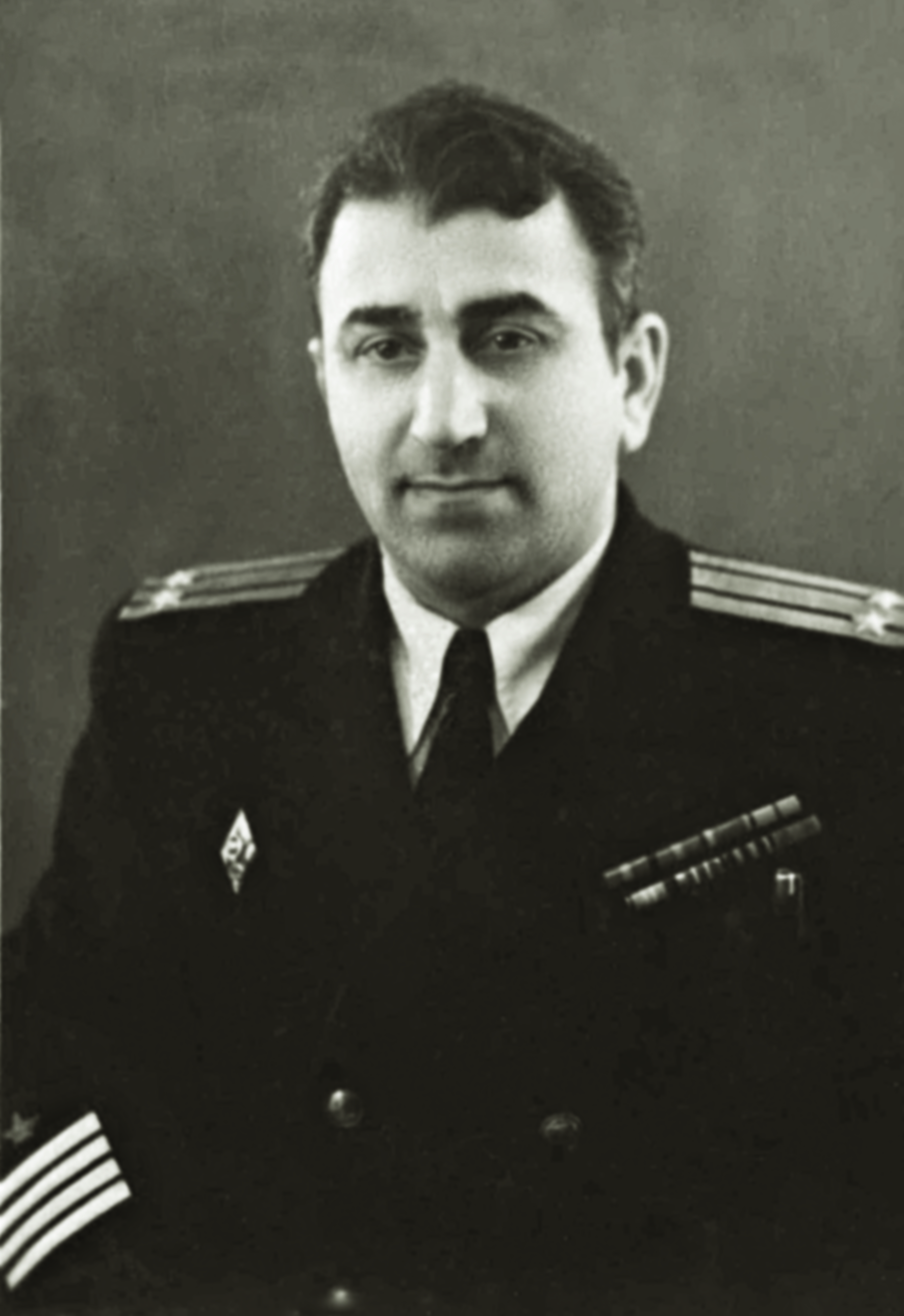
Captain Jalil Javadov, 1956

At the end of 1946 Javadov was transferred to the Caspian Navy as gunner of the "small hunters". On the order of the Commander-in-Chief of the Soviet Navy, Senior Lieutenant Jalil Javadov, was assigned special gunner of landing ships on April 18, 1947. Also, he was awarded the rank of Captain lieutenant on October 10, 1947. By the order of the Presidium of the Supreme Soviet of the USSR dated February 22, 1948, the captain-lieutenant was awarded Jubilee Medal "30 Years of the Soviet Army and Navy".

On February 14, 1949, captain-lieutenant Jalil Javadov was sent to The Voluntary Society of Assistance to the Navy to continue his service. On February 24, 1949, Javadov was appointed deputy chairman of the Republic Committee of DOSFLOT of Azerbaijan SSR. On October 31, 1951, Jalil Javadov was the chief commander-instructor of the Baku Naval Club, and on November 1, 1951, he was appointed chief of the Training Department of Naval Organization of DOSAAF.

By the order of the Minister of Navy of USSR, dated November 6, 1951, Jalil Javadov was awarded the rank of 3rd degree captain. On February 19, 1953, Javadov was chairman of the Baku Province Committee of DOSAAF, and on May 31 he was appointed Deputy Chairman of the Republican Committee of DOSAAF of the Azerbaijan SSR. On February 27, 1954, Jalil Javadov was elected chairman of the Republic Committee of the organisation.

Jalil Javadov was awarded the military rank of 2nd degree captain in March 1956 and 1st degree in 1961.

In 1959, Jalil Javadov was elected deputy of the Supreme Soviet of the Azerbaijan SSR from the 5th convocation of Hila constituency. In 1959-1963 Javadov was elected as the deputy of the Communist Party of XX, XXI, XXII, XXIII, XXIV congresses. At the XXIV congress he was elected a member of the Azerbaijan Communist Party Inspection Commission. Javadov was a member of the Central Committee of the Central Committee of the Communist Party of Azerbaijan in 1959–1953, a member of the Presidium of the USSR OADYKC in 1962–1971, and in 1967 as a member of the All-Union Central Committee of the OADYKC.

In 1959, Jalil Javadov was elected deputy of the Supreme Soviet of the Azerbaijan SSR from the 5th convocation of Khila constituency. In 1959-1963 Javadov was deputy of the Communist Party of XX, XXI, XXII, XXIII, XXIV congresses. At the XXIV congress he was member of the Azerbaijan Communist Party Inspection Commission. He was also elected candidate for membership of the Central Committee of the Communist Party of Azerbaijan in 1959–1963, a member of the Presidium of the USSR DOSAAF in 1962–1971, and in 1967, member of the All-Union Central Committee of the DOSAAF.

On February 19, 1968, according to Resolution 110 of the USSR Council of Ministers, Jalil Javadov was awarded military rank of Counter Admiral. Jalil Javadov was not only the first Azerbaijani to receive the rank, but also the first representative of the Muslim people of the USSR.

On April 11, 1970, the Counter Admiral was awarded the Medal "For Battle Merit" under the order of the USSR Minister of Defense, Marshal Andrei Grechko.

On February 7, 1971, Admiral Jalil Javadov resigned from his position as Chairman of the DOSAAF of Azerbaijan SSR for health reasons.

Counter Admiral Jalil Javadov died on February 6, 1980, in Baku.

== Military ranks ==
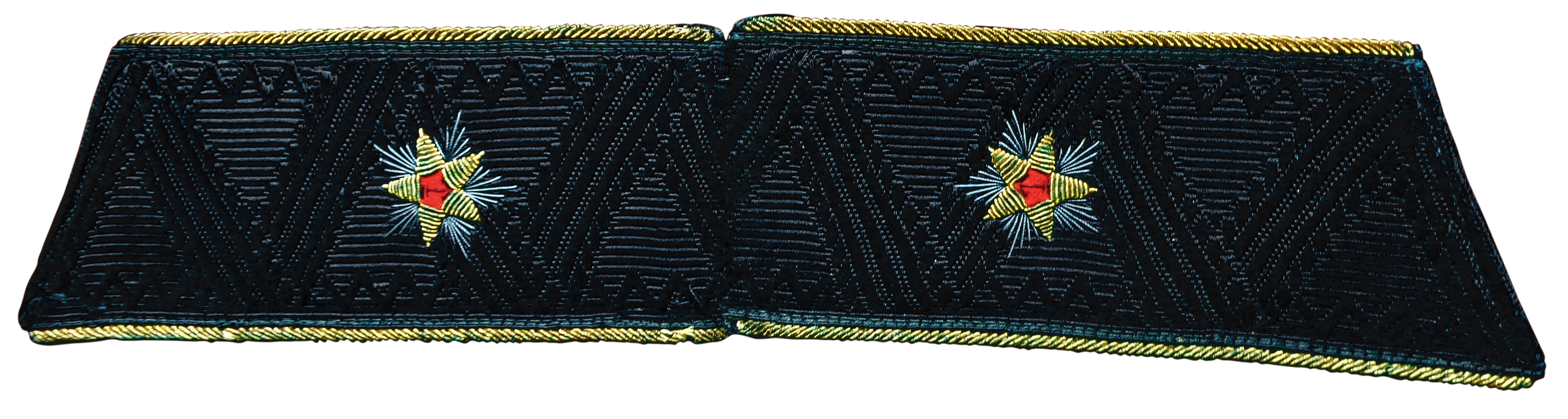

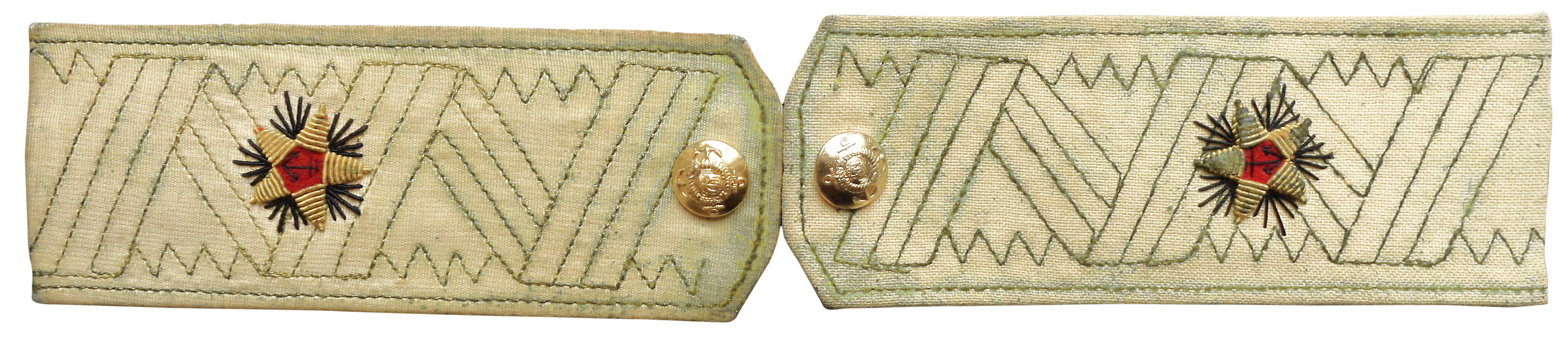
Epaulettes of the Counter Admiral

- Michman – March 18, 1941
- Lieutenant – June 24, 1941
- Senior Lieutenant - March 16, 1944
- Captain Lieutenant – October 10, 1947
- 3rd degree Captain – November 6, 1951
- 2nd degree Captain – March 24, 1956
- 1st degree Captain – September 29, 1961
- Counter Admiral – February 19, 1968

== Awards ==
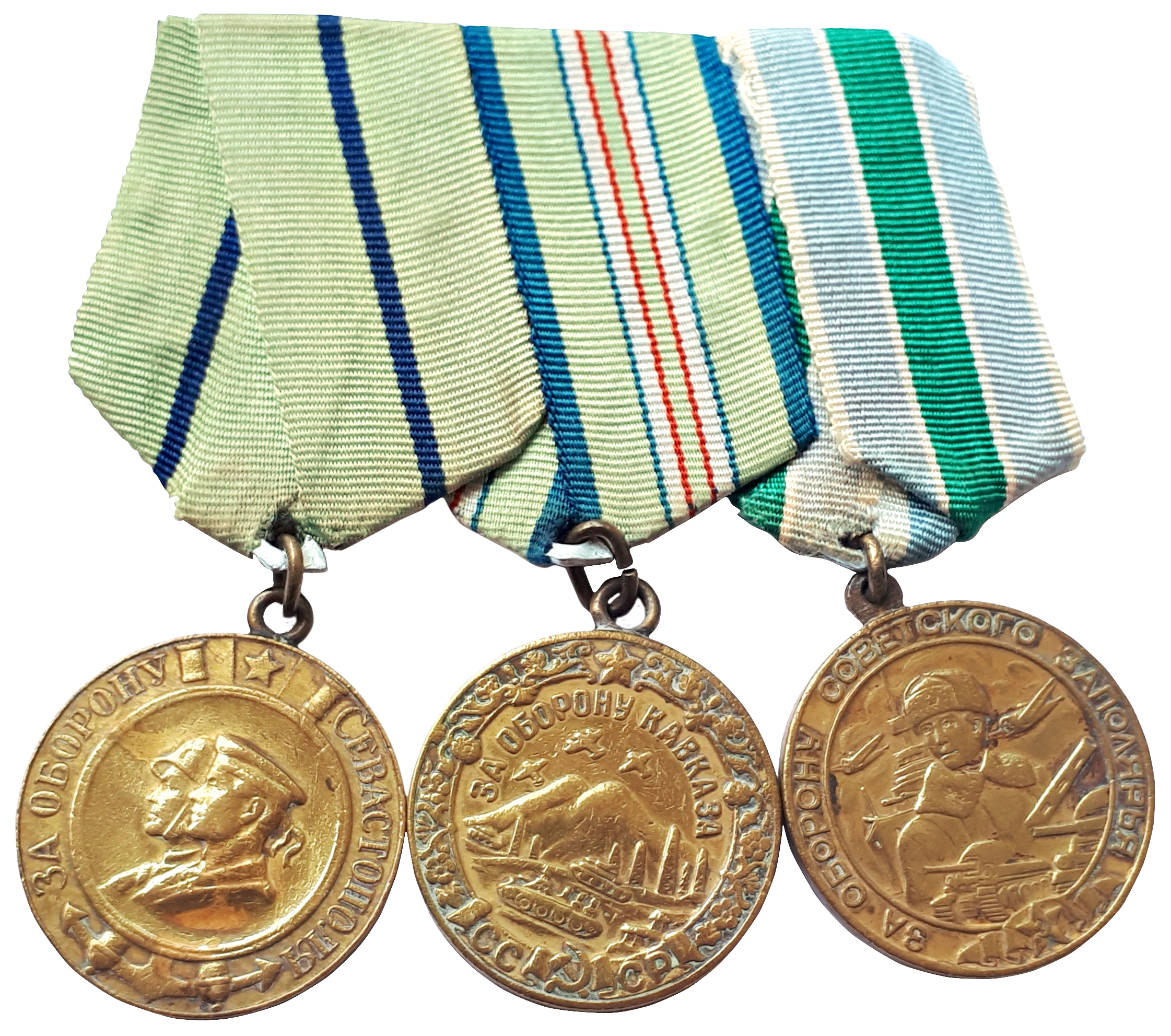
Some battle medals of Javadov

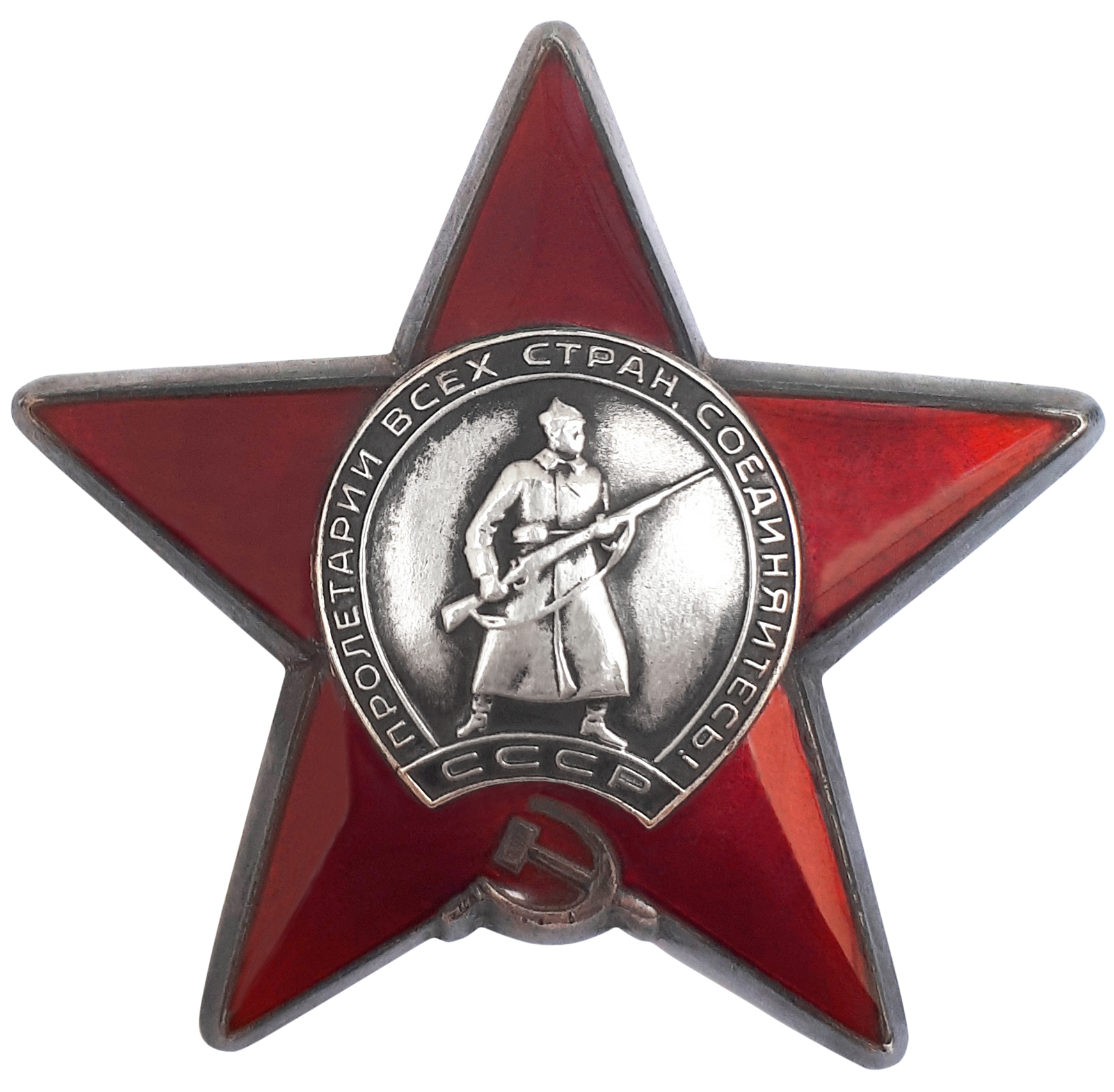
One two of Orders of the Red Star of the Counter Admiral

Battle

- Order of the Red Star (two times)
- Medal "For Battle Merit"
- Medal "For the Defence of Sevastopol"
- Medal "For the Defence of the Caucasus"
- Medal "For the Defence of the Soviet Transarctic"
- Medal "For the Victory over Germany in the Great Patriotic War 1941–1945"
- Medal "For Valiant Labour in the Great Patriotic War 1941–1945"
- Jubilee Medal "30 Years of the Soviet Army and Navy"

For the services in DOSAAF

- Medal "For Valour"
- Jubilee Medal "Twenty Years of Victory in the Great Patriotic War 1941–1945"
- Medal "Veteran of the Armed Forces of the USSR"
- Medal "Veteran of Labour"
- "Honorary Badge of the USSR DOSAAF"
- Badge "For the active work"
- Honorary memorial badge of "USSR DOSAAF" (two times)
- Jubilee medal "80th Anniversary of DOSAAF" (presented to his family)
- Jubilee Medal "Sixty Years of Victory in the Great Patriotic War 1941–1945" (presented to his family)

== Family ==
On July 19, 1948, Jalil Javadov married to Gulsum Azad gizi Baghirbeyova, born in 1929. Jalil Javadov's children are:

- Hamida (b. 1950)
- Farida (b. 1953)
- Jamila (b. 1963)
- Azadeh (b. 1964)

== See also ==
- DOSAAF

== Literature ==
=== In Azerbaijani ===
- Əhmədov, Səbuhi (2018). Admiral Cəlil Cavadov: həyatı və döyüş yolu (in Azerbaijani). Baku. ISBN 978-9952-37-076-8.
- Cavadov Cəlil Məmmədəli oğlu // "Azərbaycan Sovet Ensiklopediyası, c.X. Bakı, 1987, s.391
- Cəlil Məmmədəli oğlu Cavadov // "Bakının səsi" qəzeti, 20-26 aprel 1997
- Əliyev Z. Onun mənəvi haqqı, bizim vətəndaşlıq borcumuz // "Səhər" qəzeti, 13 iyul 1991
- Nəzirli Ş. Qəhrəmanların sorağında // "Bakı" qəzeti, 7 aprel 1987
- Susqun ömrün qaynar xatirələri. Müəllif Təranə// "Kaspi" qəzeti, 13-14 fevral 2001
- Yasinzadə Ə. Kontr-admiral Cavadov // "Yurddaş" qəzeti, 13 yun 1991
- Həsənov A. Admiral doğma kəndində // "Abşeron" qəzeti, 26 aprel 1975
- Qritçenko A. Mərd və mətanətli adam // "Azərbaycan ordusu" qəzeti, 9 avqust 1996

=== In Russian ===
- Ахмедов, Сабухи (2018). "Первый адмирал Азербайджана" (PDF). İRS — Международный Азербайджанский журнал. No. 95. Baku. ISSN 1992-4828.
- Б.Бирюзов С.С. Советский солдат на балканах. Мосува, 1963
- Военный путь Советского Военно-Морского флота. Москва, 1974
- Быть полезными Родине // журнал "Радио", 1964 г., No.4
- В борьбе против нацизма мы были вместе. Каталог выставки. Центральный Музей Великой Отечественной войны 1941-1945 гг. Москва, 2015
- Великая Отечественная. День за Днём. // журнал "Морской сборник", 1994, No.8
- Володин А.Н., Мерлай Н.М. Медали СССР. Санкт-Петербург, 1997
- Вьюненко Н.П., Мординов Р.Н., Военные флотилии в Великой Отечественной войне. Москва, 1957
- Генералы Азербайджана. Каталог. Музей истории Азербайджана. Баку, 2005
- Головко А.Г. Вместе с флотом. Москва, 1984
- Гритченко А. Через всю войну // "Xəzərin keşiyində" qəzeti, 29 yanvar, 5, 12, 19, 26 fevral, 5, 12 mart 1994
- Ермаш Л.Л., Бирюк В.С. Малые охотники типа МО-IV. Москва, 1999
- Иванов В.Б. ЧВВМУ им. П.С.Нахимова. История. Люди. События. Энциклопедическое издание // ivb.com.ua
- Имени героя. Бакинский радиоклуб имени Ази Асланова // журнал "Радио" 1985 г., No.1
- Кирин И.Д., Черноморский флот в битве за Кавказ. Москва, 1958
- Козлов И.А., Шломин В.С. Краснознаменный Северный флот. Москва, 1983
- Колесников Г.А., Рожков А.М. Ордена и медали СССР. Минск, 1986
- Комал Ф.Б. Военные кадры накануне войны // "Военно-исторический журнал" No.2, 1990 г.
- Корабли и суда ВМФ СССР 1925-1945. Справочник / Бережный С.С. / Москва, 1988
- Краснознаменная Каспийская флотилия: Знаменательные даты, события, документы, цифры, факты: Пособие для пропагандистов и агитаторов. Под руков. А.А. Гритченко. Баку, 1990.
- Краткий очерк истории боев и деятельности 6-го Краснознамённого Керченского дивизиона морских охотников Черноморского флота в период Великой Отечественной войны 1941-1945 гг. Одесса, 1989.
- Кузнецов Н.Г. Курсом к победе. Москва, 1975
- Кузнецов Н.Г. На флотах боевая тревога. Москва, 1971
- Локтионов И.И., Дунайская флотилия в Великой Отечественной войне (1941-1945 гг.), Москва, 1962
- Мужество старших – пример молодым. Баку, 1974
- Неменко А.В. Черноморский флот в годы войны. 1941-1945. Москва, 2015
- Неуловимый монитор // журнал "Моделист-конструктор", 1985, No.3
- Огарков Н.В. Керченско-Венская бригада речных кораблей // Советская Военная Энциклопедия. Москва, 1977. т.4. с. 144-145
- Плехов И.М., Хратов С.П. Речные танки идут в бой // журнал "Катера и яхты" 1982 г., No.4 (98),
- Самедов А. Первый адмирал Азербайджана // газета "Гюнай", 13 июля 2002
- Свет для потомков // газета "Вышка", 27 февраля 1985
- Северный флот // Великая Отечественная война 1941-1945. Энциклопедия. Под ред. М.Козлова. Москва, 1985.
- Синенко В.И. Операция "Килия-Веке". Москва, 1975.
- Скляров Ю. Его моральное право, наш гражданский долг // газета "Каспиец", 15 августа 1991
- Фокеев К.Ф. Десант в Линахамари. Москва, 1968
- Широковад А.Поход на Вену. Москва, 2005
- Школа юнг // Великая Отечественная война 1941-1945. Энциклопедия. Под ред. М.Козлова. Москва, 1985.
