= Nağdalı =

Nağdalı or Nagdali or Nagdaly or Nakhdalli or Nagadaly may refer to:

- Nağdalı, Absheron, Azerbaijan
- Nağdalı, Lachin, Azerbaijan
