= Yekəxana =

Yekəxana or Yekaxana or Yekya-Khana or Yekakhana or Yekekhana may refer to:

- Yekəxana, Gobustan, Azerbaijan
- Yekəxana, Goychay, Azerbaijan
