= Çay Qurbançı =

- Location within Azerbaijan
- Coordinates: 40°36′39″N 49°00′22″E
- Country: Azerbaijan
- Rayon: Gobustan
- Municipality: Qurbançı
- Time zone: UTC+4 (AZT)
  - Summer (DST): UTC+5 (AZT)

Çay Qurbançı (also, Chay Kurbanchy and Chaykurabanchi) is a village in the Gobustan Rayon of Azerbaijan. The village forms part of the municipality of Qurbançı.
