= Çelov =

- Municipality
- Location within Azerbaijan
- Coordinates: 40°34′17″N 48°52′43″E
- Country: Azerbaijan
- Rayon: Gobustan

Population
  - Total: 1,310
- Time zone: UTC+4 (AZT)
  - Summer (DST): UTC+5 (AZT)

Çelov (also, Chalov and Çalov) is a village and municipality in the Gobustan Rayon of Azerbaijan. It has a population of 1,310.
