= Cəmcəmli =

- Municipality
- Location within Azerbaijan
- Coordinates: 40°28′08″N 48°53′59″E
- Country: Azerbaijan
- Rayon: Gobustan

Population
  - Total: circa 1,200
- Time zone: UTC+4 (AZT)
  - Summer (DST): UTC+5 (AZT)

Cəmcəmli (also, Cəm-Cəmli and Dzhamdzhamly) is a village and municipality in the Gobustan Rayon of Azerbaijan. It has a population of 1,132. The municipality consists of the villages of Cəmcəmli and Damlamaca.
