= Diri Baba Mausoleum =

Historic site in Gobustan, Azerbaijan

- Diri Baba məqbərəsi
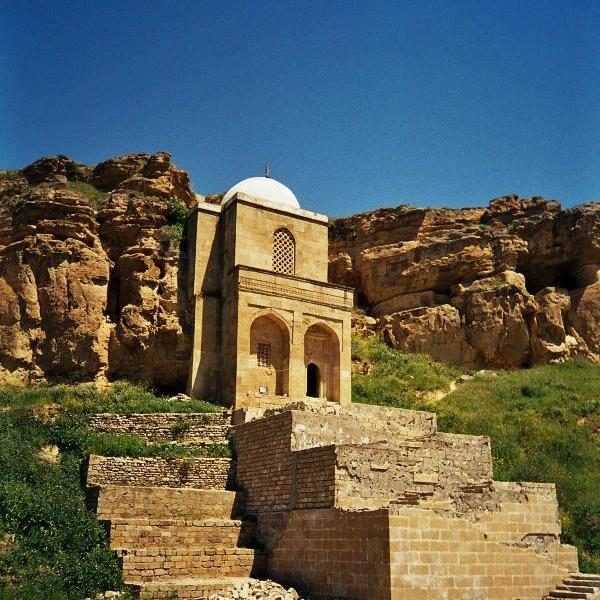
- Interactive map of Diri Baba Mausoleum
- Location: Maraza city, Gobustan Rayon, Azerbaijan
- Coordinates: 40°31′57″N 48°56′31″E
- Type: Mausoleum
- Completion date: 1402
- Dedicated to: Sheikh Diri Baba

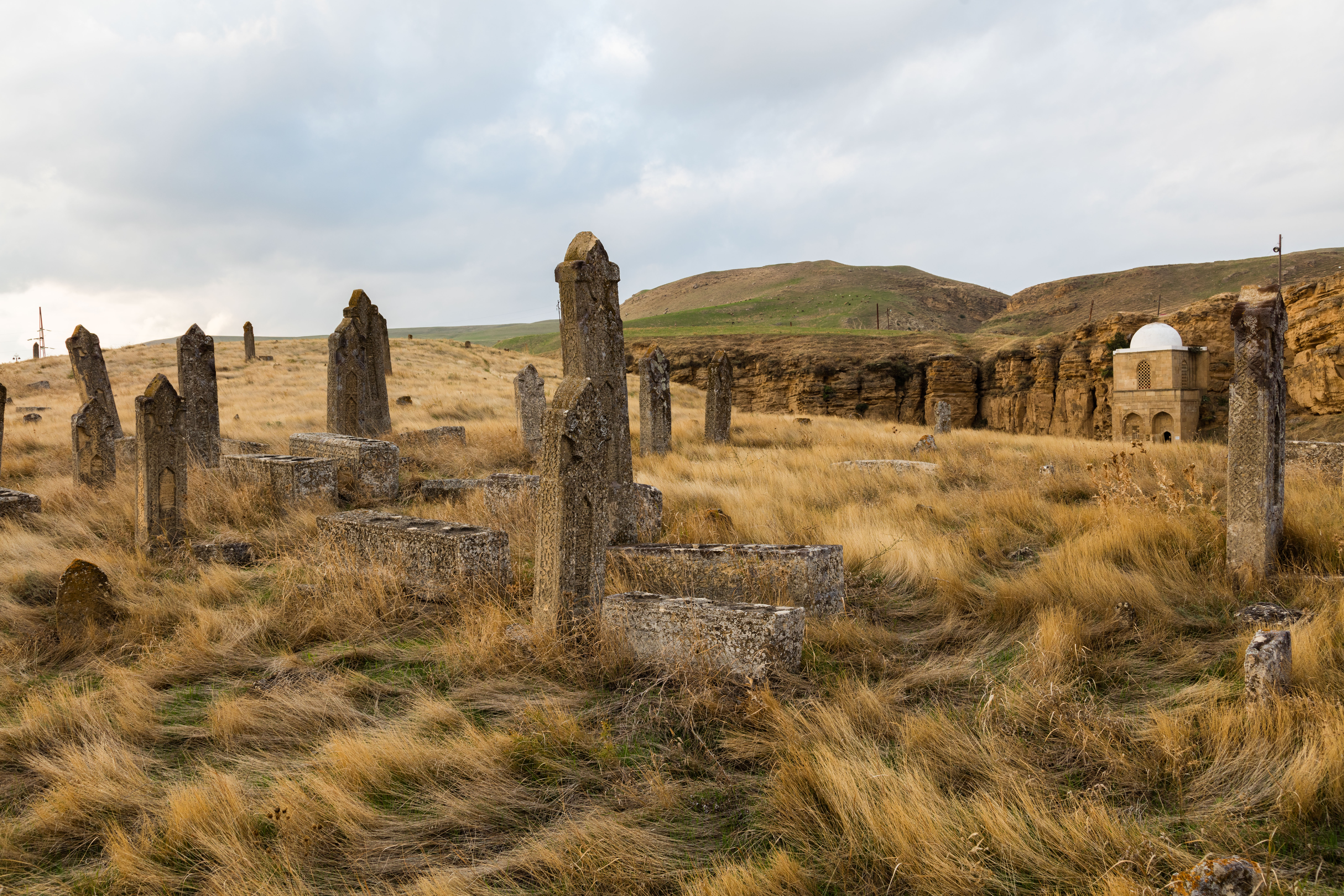
Image of the old cemetery nearby.

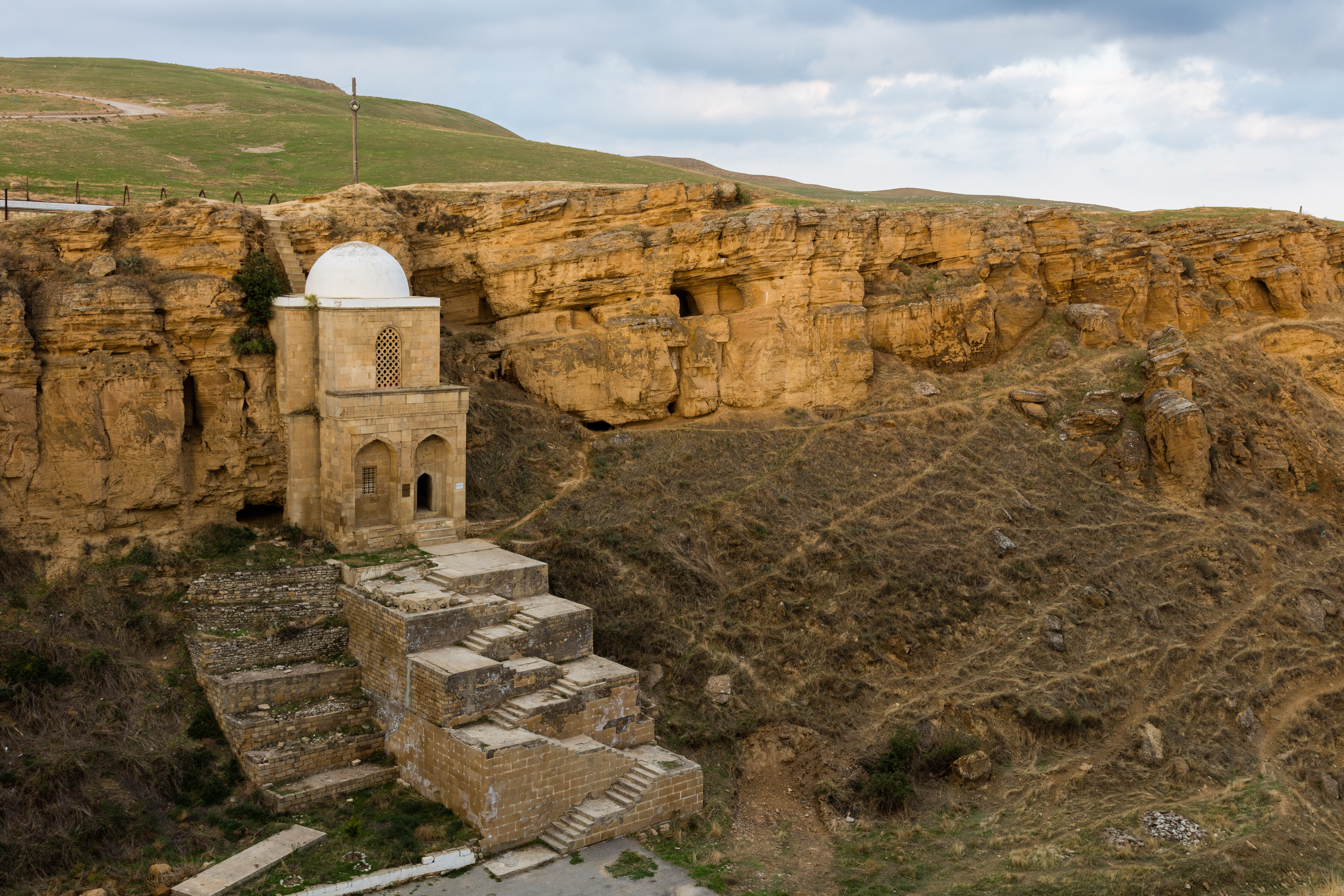
A distant view of the mausoleum

The Diri Baba Mausoleum (Azerbaijani: Diri Baba məqbərəsi) – is a mausoleum of Sheikh Diri Baba, located in Qobustan (town) of Gobustan Rayon of Azerbaijan.

== Architecture ==
The mausoleum was described in the diaries of K. de Bryuin and A.Oleariy, and also in a work of B.Dorn. The mausoleum stands in a square located on a glyptic cliff. The building is two-storeyed. The first store has a hall covered with an ogive, which has a passageway to an octahedral cupola from a small vestibule. Stairs leading to the hall of the second store have been carved on the cliff. A spherical cupola with a pointed top has squinches decorated with plant ornaments.

There is a fragment of a ligature, indicating a date – the year 1402, and also a part of the architect's name – “…the son of ustad Haji” – in one of the squinches. Many legends and myths are connected to this place. Diri Baba mausoleum was decorated with a mosaic and effective ligature by a calligraphist called “Dervish”.

There is a unique monument – a two-story mausoleum-mosque of the 15th century called “Diri-Baba”, located opposite an ancient cemetery – on the way from Baku to Shamakhi. For a long time, residents believed in a legend that a sacred person called Diri Baba was buried here and remained imperishable. However, many legends and mystic events are related to this monument. That is why the mausoleum attracted many pilgrims and curious people since the 17th century. The peculiarity of the construction is that it was embedded in the cliff by the architect. Allegedly it is “hanging” alienated from the ground. The mausoleum delights with the austerity of its architecture, purity of lines, bright and smooth surface of its walls against the background of the rough and dark cliff, and it is also distinguished by its grandeur. It is notable that, not the first, but the second store is considered the main part of the building. A small corridor covered with an octagonal cupola, where guests take their shoes off, is followed by the hall. There is an entrance to half-dark stairs carved in the thickness of the cliff, and these stairs lead to the second store of a burial vault. A hall – with an area of 15 quadratic meters – is covered with a spherical cupola. A funeral text, which indicates the name of a ruler of the Shirvanshahs – Ibrahim I of Shirvan, is carved in the wall. A decorative tier, with a ligature as if surrounding the building, detaches the floors. The mausoleum is closely adjoined the cliff, on a massif of which is carved a grotto. This place is where the Saint was buried. A narrow entry in the northern wall leads to this place.

The architecture of Diri Baba mausoleum harmonically fits into the picturesque surroundings of the building – view against the background of rocks and greenery of trees. The building of the mausoleum is a masterpiece of the architectural school of Shirvan and a beautiful creation of the arts of ancient masters. The monument is protected by the government.
