= Keytikh =

- Location within Azerbaijan
- Coordinates: 40°19′53″N 49°08′04″E
- Country: Azerbaijan
- Rayon: Absheron
- Time zone: UTC+4 (AZT)
  - Summer (DST): UTC+5 (AZT)

Keytikh (also known as Keymikh, Keytakh, Kochevka Kaytakh, Kochevka Keytakh, and Kyurdemich) is a village in the Absheron Rayon of Azerbaijan.
