= Uzun-Dere =

- Location within Azerbaijan
- Coordinates: 40°22′N 49°16′E
- Country: Azerbaijan
- Rayon: Absheron
- Time zone: UTC+4 (AZT)
  - Summer (DST): UTC+5 (AZT)

Uzun-Dere (also known as Kishlak Uzun-Bara) is a village in the Absheron Rayon of Azerbaijan.
