= Shirvan National Park =

Azerbaijani national park

Shirvan National Park Şirvan Milli Parkı
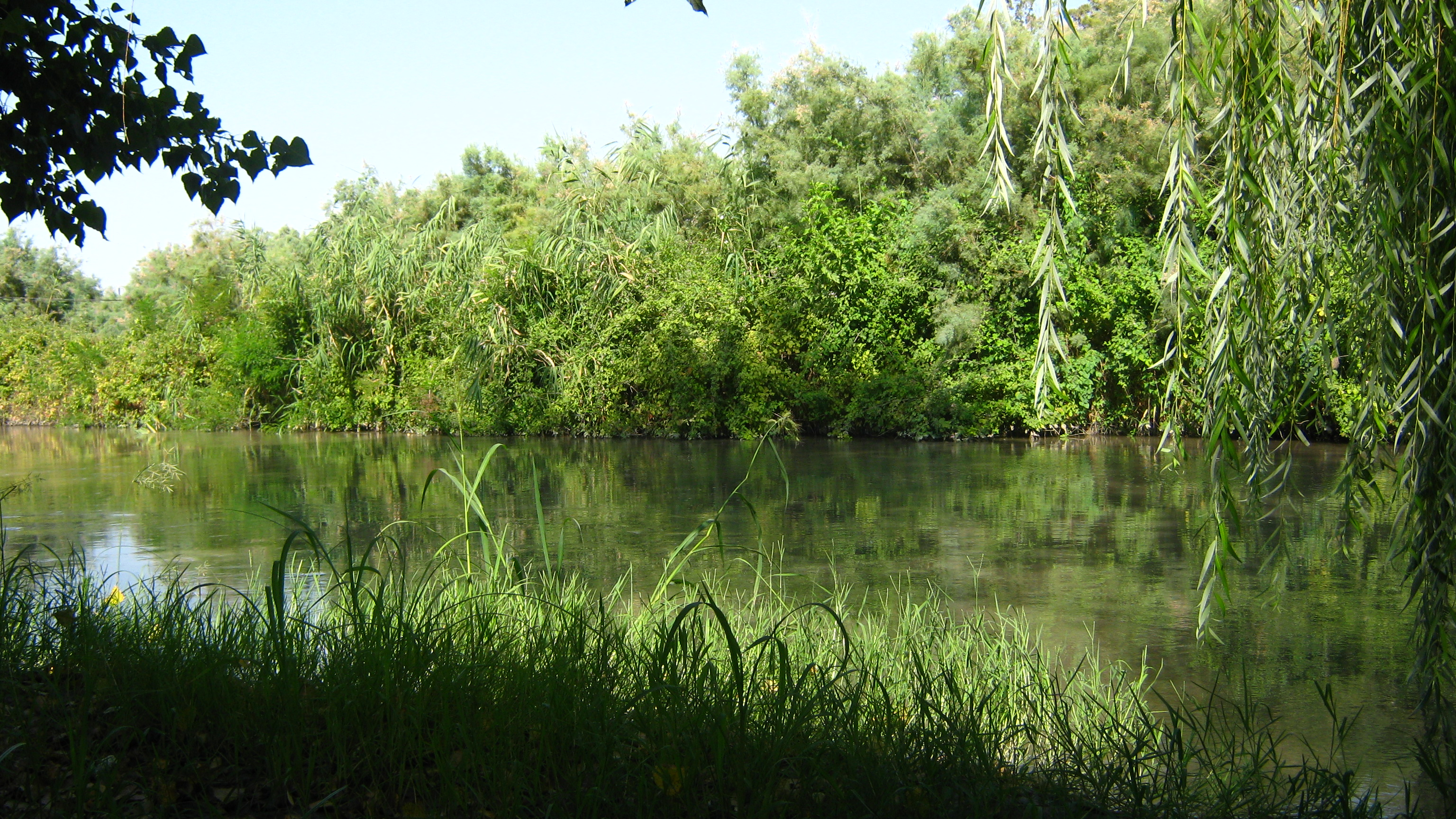
- Wetlands in Shirvan National Park

- Location within Azerbaijan
- 39°32′51″N 49°00′56″E
- Location: Salyan Rayon

Site notes
- Area: 54,373.5 hectares (543.735 km^{2})
- Governing body: Republic of Azerbaijan; Ministry of Ecology and Natural Resources

Shirvan National Park (Azerbaijani: Şirvan Milli Parkı) — is a national park of Azerbaijan. It was established on July 5, 2003, within the territory of Salyan Rayon administrative districts. Its surface area is 54,373.5 hectares (543.735 km^{2}).

The Shirvan National Park was established on the base of the Shirvan State Reserve founded in 1969 and neighbouring areas. The reserve's activity is focused on the protection and reproduction of the goitered gazelle (Gazella subgutturosa), waterfowl birds and typical plant biotypes of the Shirvan Lowland. The area is 25800 hectares, of which 3500 hectares are water reservoirs. The territory of the park used to be at the bottom of the Caspian Sea and at present it is an accumulative plain, which is 20–25 m below sea level with a slight increase in the relief westwards. In terms of climate the park lies in an area of moderate warm semi-desert and arid steppe. Summers are hot and dry and winters are cool and dry.

== Etymology ==
The word 'Shirvan' appears to be derived from Shīr (Persian: شیر). The word shir refers to the lion, which is now extinct in the Trans-Caucasus.

== Flora and fauna ==
=== Flora ===
In the park there are several types of vegetation. The desert type is represented by Halocnemum, Halostachys and Salicornia formations developed on solonchaks ‘'Halocnemum vegetation occupies about 40% of the territory of the park. The main species is the Halocnemum strobilaceum. The Halostachys phytocenosis has a more complicated structure and a richer species composition than Halocnemum. At the tops of the hills Halostachys grows and the slopes are covered by cereals and motley grass from the ephemeral group.

Salicornia vegetation has developed in a small area of the central part of the park as a result of wet salines and the high level of ground waters. As well as Salicornia europaea, there is also S. rankenive and S. tonkokhstnik.

The semi-desert type of vegetation is represented by formations of sveda and ephemeral wormwood. The latter formation, which occupies 40% of the park area, has the richest species composition. Wormwood dominates, and among ephemera 20-25 species are met, including mast cereals: Poa bulbosa, Bromus, wall barley (Hordeum murinum), etc.

Meadow-type vegetation is developed in the park on chals (humid lowerings on the relief). The herbage is two-layered and is formed of Alhagi (first layer) and Aeluropus repens (second layer). In some places Artemisia and wall barley (Hordeum murinum) are found.

=== Fauna ===
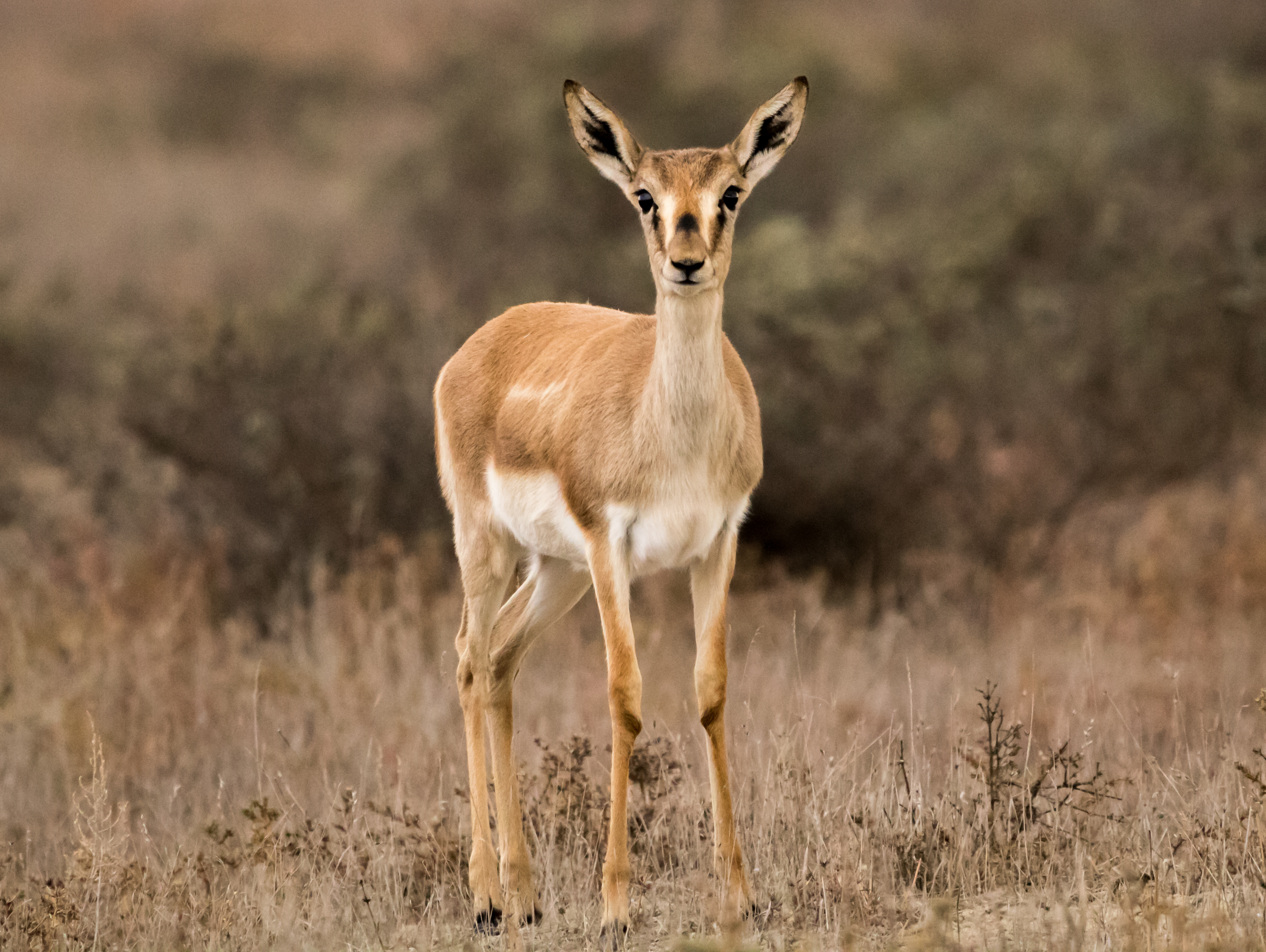
Goitered gazelle

The fauna is poorly studied. Among amphibians there are variable toad (Bufotes variabilis), tree frogs (Hyla spp.) and marsh frog (Pelophylax ridibundus). Among reptiles there are European pond turtle (Emys orbicularis), Caspian turtle (Mauremys caspica) and Greek tortoise (Testudo graeca), lizard, grass snake (Natrix natrix) Levantine viper (Macrovipera lebetinus) and others. The avifauna is poorly studied, but according to the existing data there are bustards (Otidae), francolins (Francolinus spp.), little bustards (Otis tetrax), white-tailed eagles (Haliaeetus albicilla), steppe eagles (Aquila nipalensis), peregrine falcons (Falco peregrinus), saker falcons (Falco cherrug) and black-bellied sandgrouse (Pterocles orientalis). In winter, there are many migratory birds on the water bodies such as greylag geese (Anser anser), mallards (Anas platyrhynchos), northern pintail (Anas acuta) and others.

Among rare mammals species there are red fox, Persian gazelle, wild boar, wolf, jackal, jungle cat, badger, European hare, and others. Greek tortoise, Persian gazelle, black francolin, bustard, little bustard, white-tailed eagle, steppe eagle, peregrine falcon, saker falcon, which are listed in the Red Book of Azerbaijan. In the past, this area was once within the range of Asiatic lion, a population or the junior synonym of the Northern lion, in the Caucasus, and the Caspian tiger used to visit it from Persia.

The main protected objects are the natural semi-desert complexes of the south-eastern Shirvan, with the world's biggest population of Persian gazelles and the water-wading ecosystem, which is a place of nesting, a migration route and wintering area for many valuable bird species (western part of the Shor-Gel Lake).

=== Goitered gazelle conservation ===
Shirvan National Park has played an important role in recovery of goitered gazelle and its reintroductions in Azerbaijan and Georgia. Gazelles from Shirvan National Park have been reintroduced to several areas including Vashlovani National Park, Qobustan, Absheron, Ajinohur steppe, Ag-Gel National Park.

== See also ==
- Etymology of the park's name
- Kura River
- Nature of Azerbaijan
- National Parks of Azerbaijan
- Shirvan steppe
- State Reserves of Azerbaijan
- List of protected areas of Azerbaijan
