= Qurbançı =

- Municipality
- Location within Azerbaijan
- Coordinates: 40°33′59″N 48°57′39″E
- Country: Azerbaijan
- Rayon: Gobustan

Population
  - Total: 694
- Time zone: UTC+4 (AZT)
  - Summer (DST): UTC+5 (AZT)

Qurbançı (also, Dagkurbanchi, Dag-Kurbanchy, Kurbanchi, and Kurbanchy) is a village and municipality in the Gobustan Rayon of Azerbaijan. It has a population of 694. The municipality consists of the villages of Qurbançı and Çay Qurbançı.
