= Pirəkəşkül =

Perekeshkul
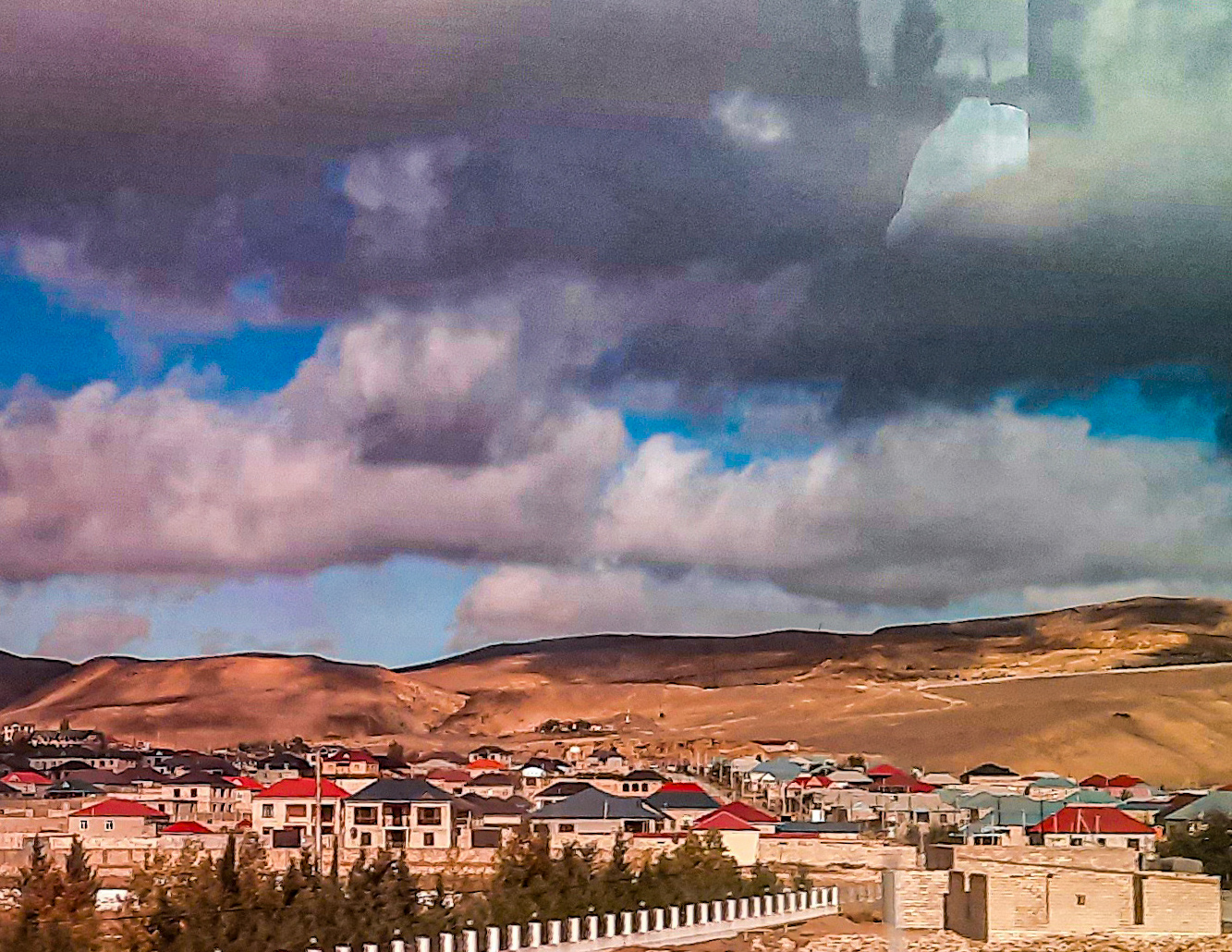

- Location within Azerbaijan
- Coordinates: 40°28′56″N 49°35′30″E
- Country: Azerbaijan
- Rayon: Absheron
- Municipality: Pirəkəşkül-Qobustan
- Time zone: UTC+4 (AZT)
  - Summer (DST): UTC+5 (AZT)

Perekeshkul (also, Perekeşkül, Pirəkəşkül, Perekeshkul’, Perekischkjul, Perekishkyul’, and Pirekeshkyul’) is a village in the Absheron Rayon of Azerbaijan. The village forms part of the municipality of Pirəkəşkül-Qobustan.

Perekeshkul is the site of a new missile base, opened on June 11, 2018, by President Ilham Aliyev. The base houses Polonez-M and LORA missile systems.
