= Miadzhik =

- Location within Azerbaijan
- Coordinates: 40°15′39″N 49°26′18″E
- Country: Azerbaijan
- Rayon: Absheron
- Time zone: UTC+4 (AZT)
  - Summer (DST): UTC+5 (AZT)

Miadzhik (also known as Minadzhykh) is a village in the Absheron Rayon of Azerbaijan.
