= Damlamaca =

- Location within Azerbaijan
- Coordinates: 40°29′38″N 48°55′17″E
- Country: Azerbaijan
- Rayon: Gobustan
- Municipality: Cəmcəmli

Population (2014)
  - Total: 0
- Time zone: UTC+4 (AZT)
  - Summer (DST): UTC+5 (AZT)

Damlamaca (also, Damlamadzha) is a former village in the Gobustan Rayon of Azerbaijan. The village formed part of the municipality of Cəmcəmli.
