= Pirəkəşkül-Qobustan =

Perekeshkul
- Location within Azerbaijan
- Coordinates: 40°28′56″N 49°35′30″E
- Country: Azerbaijan
- Rayon: Absheron
- Municipality: Pirəkəşkül-Qobustan
- Time zone: UTC+4 (AZT)
  - Summer (DST): UTC+5 (AZT)

Pirəkəşkül-Qobustan is a municipality in the Absheron Rayon of Azerbaijan. It has a population of 1,967. The municipality consists of the villages of Pirəkəşkül and Qobustan.
