= Ərəbşalbaş =

- Municipality
- Location within Azerbaijan
- Coordinates: 40°37′12″N 48°45′48″E
- Country: Azerbaijan
- Rayon: Gobustan

Population
  - Total: 3,708
- Time zone: UTC+4 (AZT)
  - Summer (DST): UTC+5 (AZT)

Ərəbşalbaş (also, Arabshalbash) is a village and the most populous municipality in the Gobustan Rayon of Azerbaijan. It has a population of 3,708.
