= Hacıvəli =

- Location within Azerbaijan
- Coordinates: 40°17′14″N 49°04′29″E
- Country: Azerbaijan
- Rayon: Absheron
- Time zone: UTC+4 (AZT)
  - Summer (DST): UTC+5 (AZT)

Hacıvəli (also, Adzhiyely) is a village in the Absheron Rayon of Azerbaijan.
