= Sədəfli =

- Village
- Location within Azerbaijan
- Coordinates: 40°29′N 48°51′E
- Country: Azerbaijan
- Rayon: Gobustan

Population
  - Total: 300
- Time zone: UTC+4 (AZT)
  - Summer (DST): UTC+5 (AZT)

Sədəfli is a village and municipality in the Gobustan Rayon of Azerbaijan. It has a population of 300.
