= Şixandağ =

- Location within Azerbaijan
- Coordinates: 40°37′27″N 49°13′42″E
- Country: Azerbaijan
- Rayon: Gobustan
- Time zone: UTC+4 (AZT)
  - Summer (DST): UTC+5 (AZT)

Şixandağ (also, Shakhan-Dag and Shakhan-Dag, Kishlak) is a village in the Gobustan Rayon of Azerbaijan.
