= Üzümcü =

Üzümcü is a Turkish surname. Derivations include the surnames Üzüm, Ozomgi, and Ouzomgi. Notable people with the surname include:

== People ==
- Ahmet Üzümcü (born 1951), Turkish diplomat
- Levent Üzümcü (born 1972), Turkish actor
- Tuna Üzümcü (born 1982), Turkish footballer

== See also ==
- Üzümçü, village in Azerbaijan
