= Haji Heybat Mosque (Fatmai) =

Mosque in Fatmayı, Azerbaijan

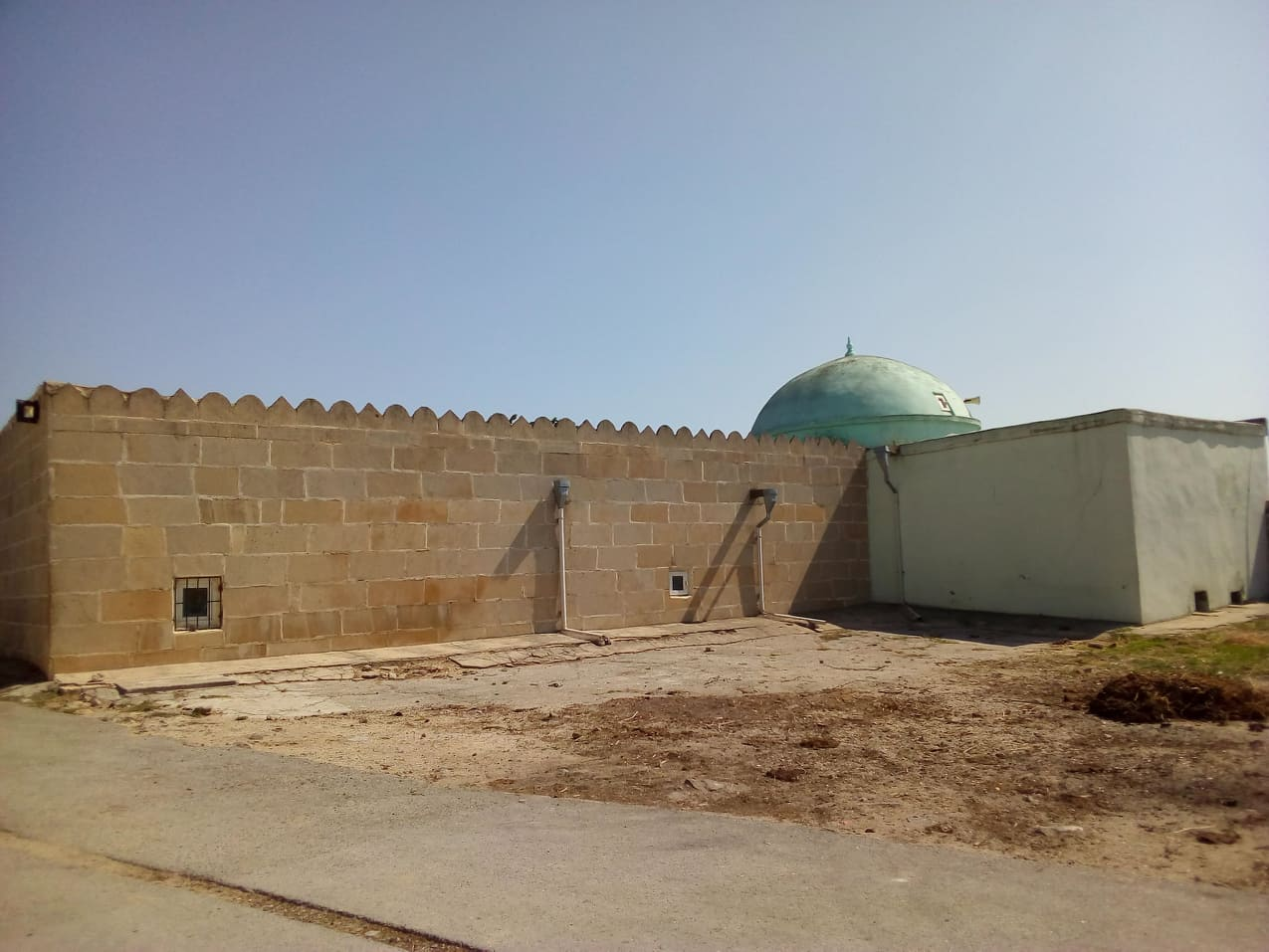
- Interactive map of Haji Heybat Mosque (Fatmai)
- Type: Mosque
- Location: Fatmayı

History
- Built: XVII century

Site notes
- Area: Baku, Azerbaijan

Haji Heybat Mosque is a mosque built in the 17th or 19th century, in the village of Fatmai, Azerbaijan.

The mosque was included in the list of immovable historical and cultural monuments of local importance by Decision No. 132 of the Cabinet of Ministers of the Republic of Azerbaijan dated August 2, 2001.

== About ==
Haji Heybat Mosque was built in the village of Fatmai. There are differing opinions about the century in which it was constructed. Some authors state that the mosque was built in the 17th century, while others suggest it was constructed in the 19th century. According to Azerbaijani architect Shamil Fatullayev, the epigraphic inscription on the mosque indicates that it was built in 1805–1806 through the efforts of the residents and Agha Kamal. The main hall of the mosque consists of four arches, with two entrance doors and two windows. A small stone inscription is located to the right of the mihrab. The mosque also has a veranda.

After the Soviet occupation, an official campaign against religion began in Azerbaijan in 1928.Many mosques, churches, and synagogues were transferred to the management of clubs for use as educational or cultural facilities. While there were about 3,000 mosques in Azerbaijan in 1917, this number dropped to 1,700 by 1927, 1,369 by 1928, and only 17 by 1933. The Haji Heybat Mosque also ceased functioning during this period.

After Azerbaijan regained its independence, the mosque was returned to the use of worshippers. On August 2, 2001, by Decision No. 132 of the Cabinet of Ministers of the Republic of Azerbaijan, the mosque was included in the list of immovable historical and cultural monuments of local importance.
