= Qaracüzlü =

- Municipality
- Location within Azerbaijan
- Coordinates: 40°34′54″N 49°04′57″E
- Country: Azerbaijan
- Rayon: Gobustan

Population
  - Total: 215
- Time zone: UTC+4 (AZT)
  - Summer (DST): UTC+5 (AZT)

Qaracüzlü (also, Kara-Dzhuzli and Karadzhyuzlyu) is a village and municipality in the Gobustan Rayon of Azerbaijan. It has a population of 215.
