= Bədəlli =

- Municipality
- Location within Azerbaijan
- Coordinates: 40°29′33″N 48°48′19″E
- Country: Azerbaijan
- Rayon: Gobustan

Population
  - Total: 977
- Time zone: UTC+4 (AZT)
  - Summer (DST): UTC+5 (AZT)

Bədəlli is a village and municipality in the Gobustan Rayon of Azerbaijan. It has a population of 977. The municipality consists of the villages of Bədəlli and Üzümçü.
