= Hökməli =

- Municipality
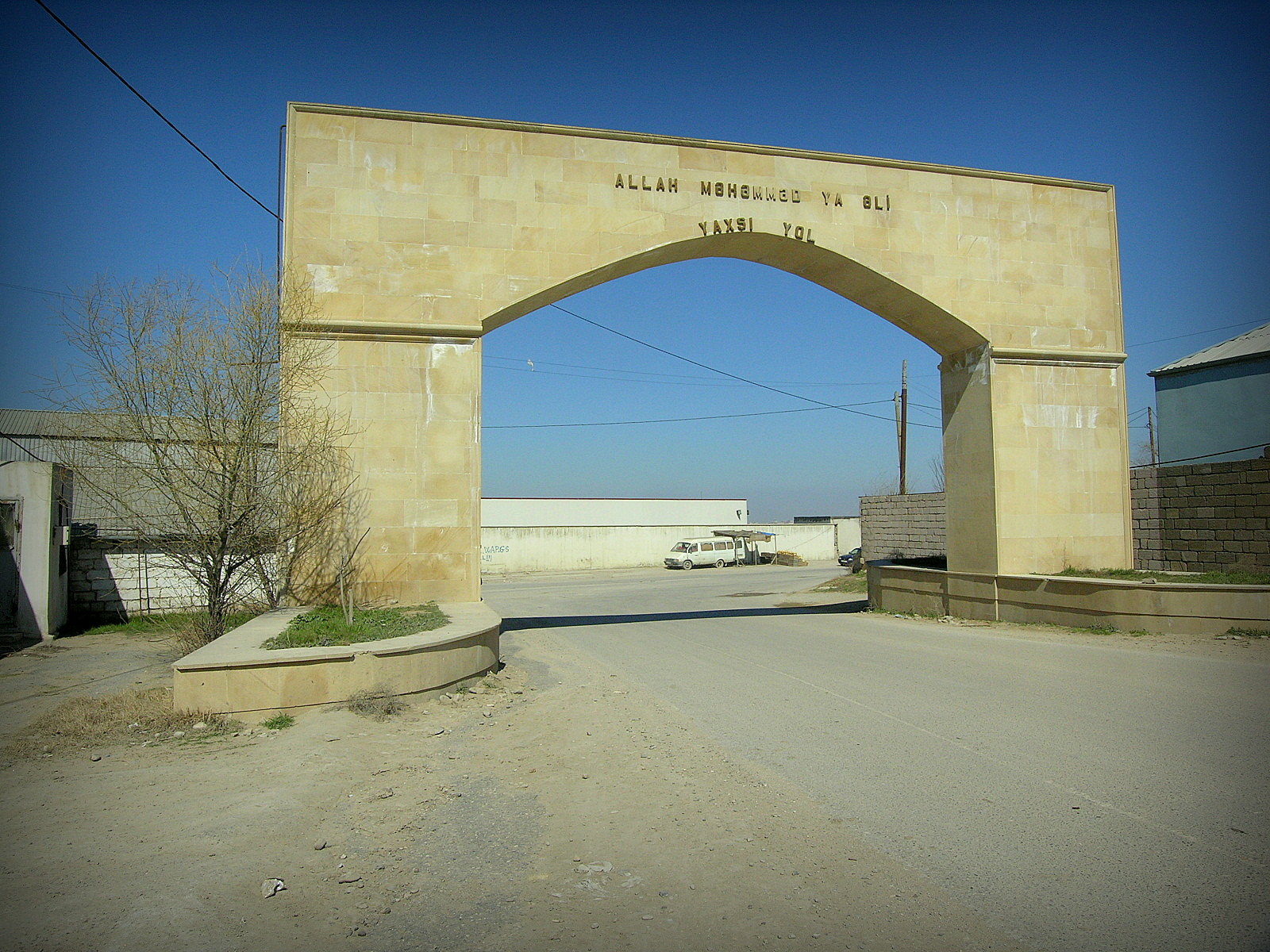

- Location within Azerbaijan
- Coordinates: 40°25′52″N 49°44′14″E
- Country: Azerbaijan
- Rayon: Absheron

Population (2008)
  - Total: 4,463
- Time zone: UTC+4 (AZT)
  - Summer (DST): UTC+5 (AZT)

Hökməli (also, Hokmaly and Hökmely) is a village and municipality in the Absheron Rayon of Azerbaijan. It has a population of 4,463.
