= Aşağı Güzdək =

Ashaghy Guzdak
- Municipality
- Azerbaijani: Aşağı Güzdək
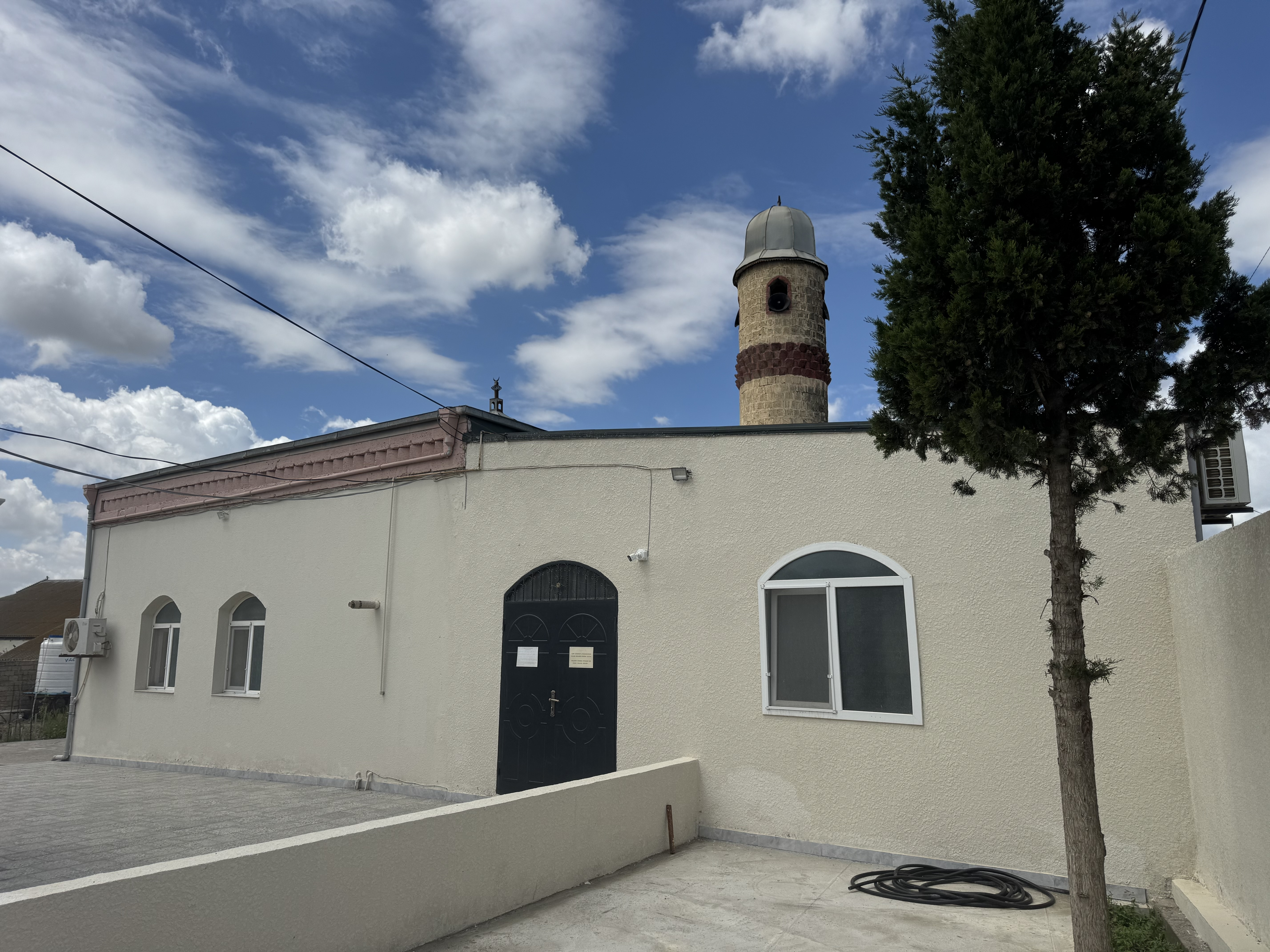

- Location within Azerbaijan
- Coordinates: 40°28′57″N 49°39′46″E
- Country: Azerbaijan
- District: Absheron

Population (2008)
  - Total: 2,755
- Time zone: UTC+4 (AZT)
  - Summer (DST): UTC+5 (AZT)

Aşağı Güzdək (also, Ashaghy Guzdak and Verkhniy Guzdak) is a village and municipality in the Absheron District of Azerbaijan. It has a population of 2,755.
