= Yekəxana, Gobustan =

Yekəxana
- Municipality
- Location within Azerbaijan
- Coordinates: 40°28′33″N 48°47′42″E
- Country: Azerbaijan
- Rayon: Gobustan

Population
  - Total: 926
- Time zone: UTC+4 (AZT)
  - Summer (DST): UTC+5 (AZT)

Yekəxana (also, Yekakhana, Yekekhana, and Yekya-Khana) is a village and municipality in the Gobustan Rayon of Azerbaijan. It has a population of 926.
