= Nağdalı, Absheron =

Nağdalı
- Location within Azerbaijan
- Coordinates: 40°30′29″N 49°31′06″E
- Country: Azerbaijan
- Rayon: Absheron
- Time zone: UTC+4 (AZT)
  - Summer (DST): UTC+5 (AZT)

Nağdalı (also, Nagdali, Nagdaly, and Nakhdalli) is a village in the Absheron Rayon of Azerbaijan.
