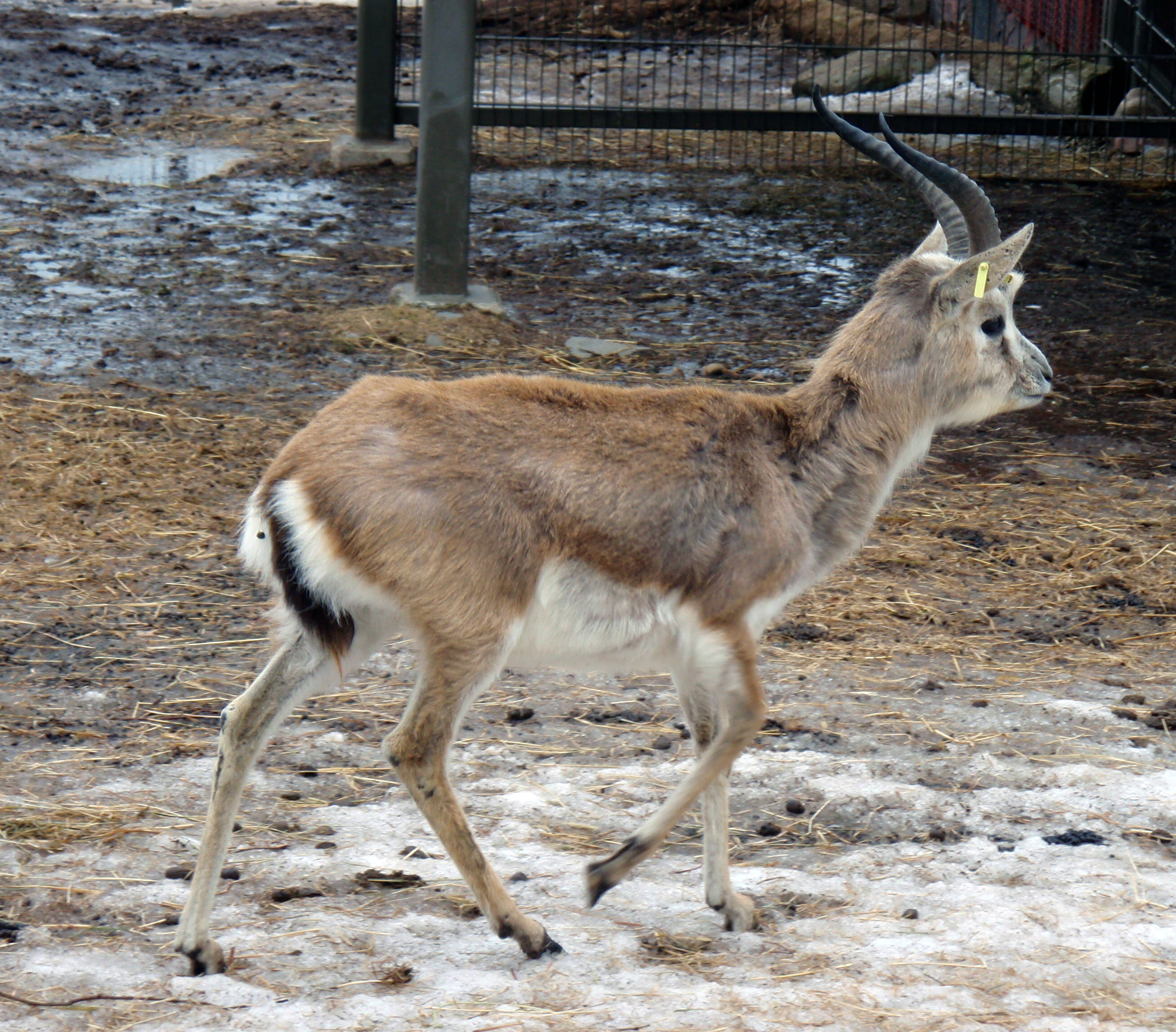
- Male of the Persian subspecies (G. s. subgutturosa) at Korkeasaari Zoo in Helsinki
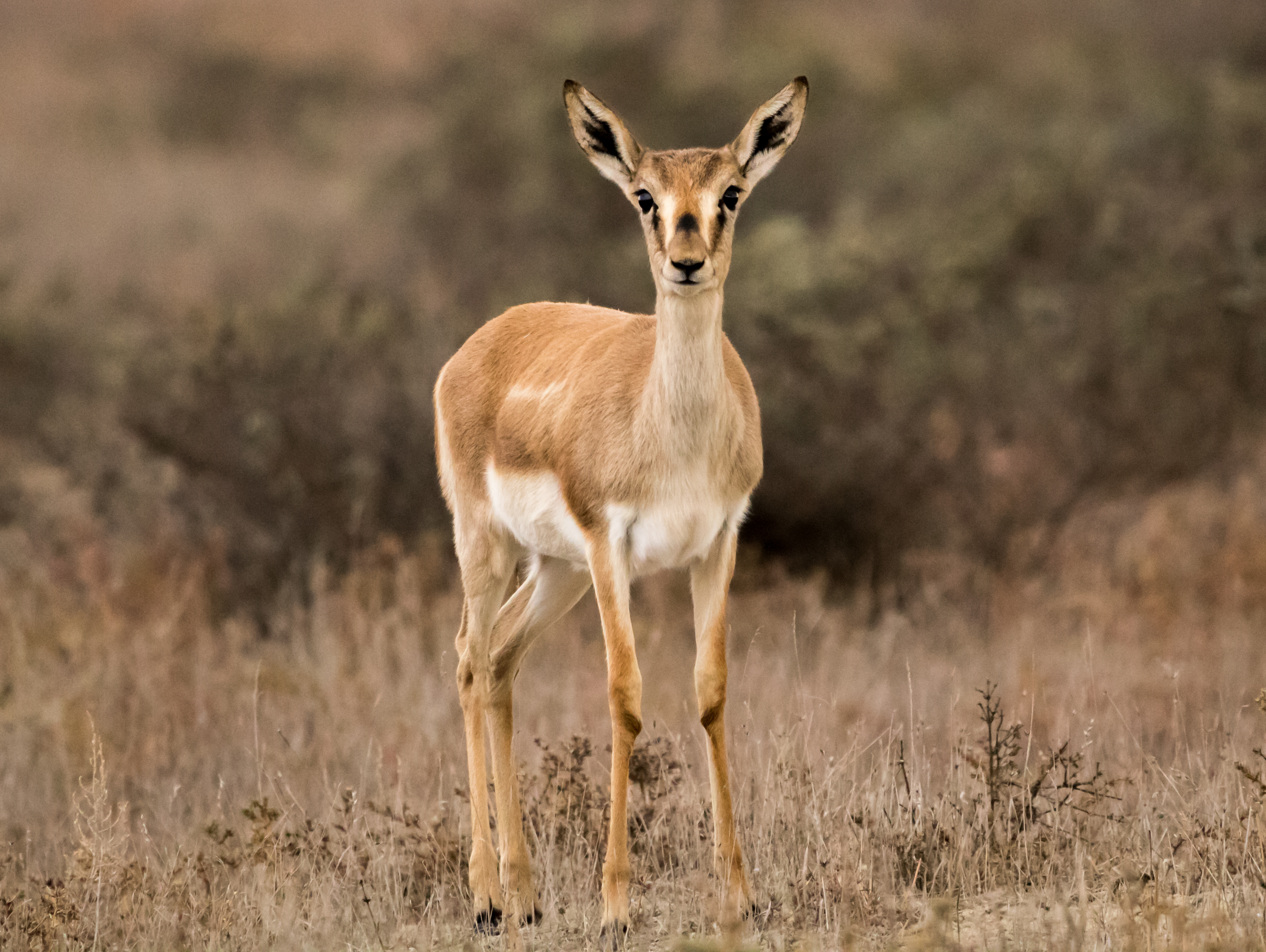
- Female goitered gazelle at the Shirvan National Park, Azerbaijan

Conservation status
- Vulnerable (IUCN 3.1)

Scientific classification
- Kingdom: Animalia
- Phylum: Chordata
- Class: Mammalia
- Infraclass: Placentalia
- Order: Artiodactyla
- Family: Bovidae
- Subfamily: Antilopinae
- Genus: Gazella
- Species: G. subgutturosa

Binomial name
- Gazella subgutturosa (Güldenstädt, 1780)

Subspecies
- Gazella subgutturosa subgutturosa; Gazella subgutturosa gracilicornis; Gazella subgutturosa hilleriana; Gazella subgutturosa yarkandensis
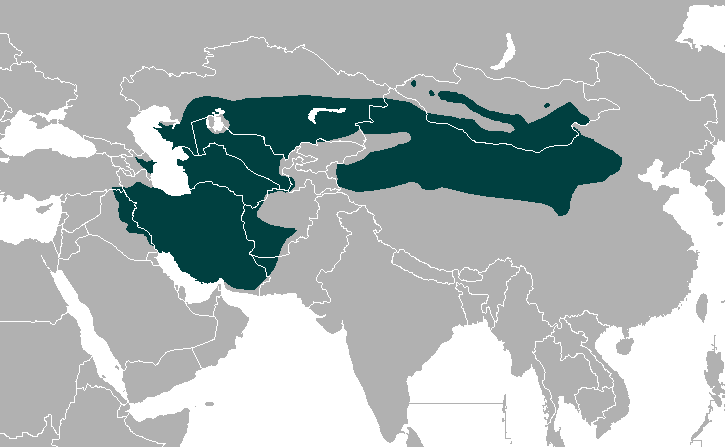

= Goitered gazelle =

Species of mammal

The goitered gazelle (Gazella subgutturosa) or black-tailed gazelle is a gazelle native to Turkey, Georgia, Azerbaijan, Iran, parts of Iraq and Pakistan, Afghanistan, Tajikistan, Kyrgyzstan, Uzbekistan, Turkmenistan, Kazakhstan and in northwestern China and Mongolia. The specific name, meaning "full below the throat", refers to the male having an enlargement of the neck and throat during the mating season.

== Distribution and habitat ==
The goitered gazelle inhabits sands and gravel plains and limestone plateau. Large herds were also present in the Near East. Some 6,000 years ago, they were captured and killed with the help of desert kites. Rock art found in Jordan suggests that it was slaughtered ritually.

== Behaviour and ecology ==
Its mating behaviour is polygynous and usually occurs in the early winter. It runs at high speed, without the leaping, bounding gait seen in other gazelle species. Throughout much of its range, the goitered gazelle migrates seasonally. Herds cover 10–30 km (6.2–18.6 mi) per day in the winter, with these distances being reduced to about 1–3 km (0.62–1.86 mi) in summer.

== Taxonomy ==
Several subspecies have been described, and four forms are distinguished, which used to be treated as separate monotypic species. Gazella marica was traditionally recognised as a subspecies, but has been identified as a species in 2011.

- Persian gazelle (Gazella (subgutturosa) subgutturosa) - southeastern Turkey, Azerbaijan, Georgia, Syria, northern and eastern Iraq, Iran, southern Afghanistan, western Pakistan
- Turkmen gazelle (Gazella (subgutturosa) gracilicornis) - Kazakhstan (Buzachi) in the east to about Lake Balkash, Turkmenistan, Tajikistan
- Yarkand gazelle (Gazella (subgutturosa) yarkandensis) - northern and northwestern China (Xinjiang, Qinghai, Shaanxi, Gansu, Nei Monggol), Mongolia; includes subspecies hilleriana.

=== Former subspecies ===
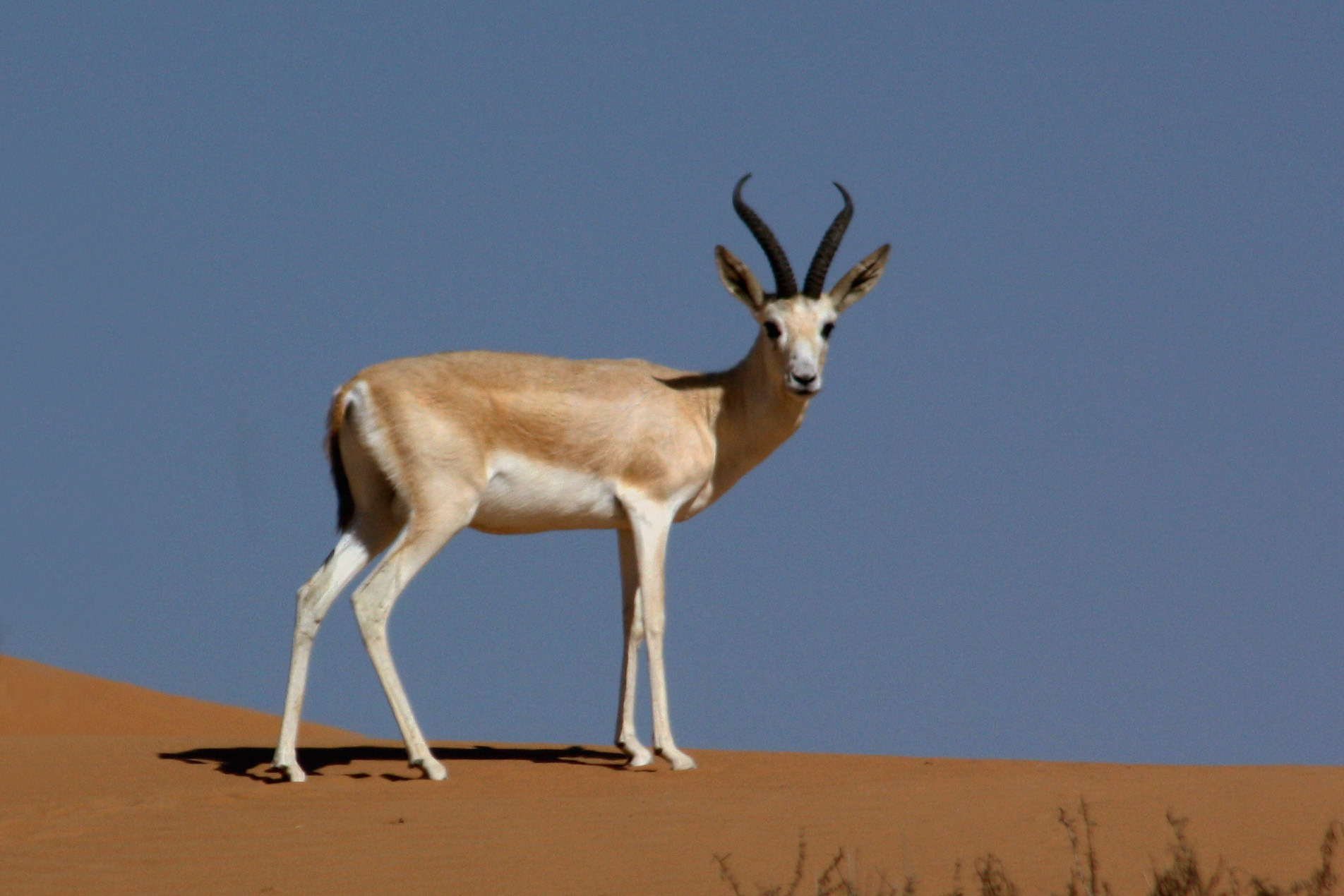
Sand gazelle (Gazella marica) at Dubai Desert Conservation Reserve, United Arab Emirates

- The Arabian sand gazelle (Gazella marica) occurs in Saudi Arabia, southern Syria, southwestern Iraq, United Arab Emirates, Oman, offshore Persian Gulf islands.

Until recently, goitered gazelles were considered to represent a single, albeit polymorphic, species. However, recent genetic studies show one of the subspecies, G. s. marica, is paraphyletic in respect to the other populations of goitered gazelles,
