= Üzümçü =

- Village
- Location within Azerbaijan
- Coordinates: 40°31′N 48°49′E
- Country: Azerbaijan
- Rayon: Gobustan
- Time zone: UTC+4 (AZT)
  - Summer (DST): UTC+5 (AZT)

Üzümçü is a village in the municipality of Bədəlli in the Gobustan Rayon of Azerbaijan.
