= Shirvan steppe =

Steppe in the Kura-Aras Lowland, Azerbaijan

The Shirvan steppe (Azerbaijani: Şirvan düzü) is part of the Kura-Aras Lowland of Azerbaijan and is located on the left bank of the Kura River.

The elevation of the steppe ranges between 16 m (52 ft) and 100 m (330 ft). The steppe has grey desert soil. Its vegetation is halophytic and wormwood, with estuary meadows. The Upper Shirvan water channel was directed from the Mingachevir Reservoir in order to irrigate the land. Animal husbandry (in winter pastures) and horticulture (cotton, crops, and grape) are the main agriculture in the steppe.

== See also ==
- Shirvan
- Shirvan (city)
- Shirvan National Park
- Shirvan State Reserve
