= Həmyəli, Gobustan =

Təklə Mirzəbaba Təklə Mirzəbaba
- Location within Azerbaijan
- Coordinates: 40°38′N 48°47′E
- Country: Azerbaijan
- Rayon: Qobustan
- Time zone: UTC+4 (AZT)
  - Summer (DST): UTC+5 (AZT)

Təklə Mirzəbaba (also, Kiçik Təklə, Cır Təklə and Balaca Təklə) is a village in the Gobustan Rayon of Azerbaijan. Mahmud Mammad-Guliyev, Deputy Minister of Foreign Affairs, was born in Həmyəli.
