= Həmyəli, Shamakhi =

Həmyəli
- Municipality
- Location within Azerbaijan
- Coordinates: 40°39′38″N 48°42′32″E
- Country: Azerbaijan
- Rayon: Shamakhi

Population
  - Total: 1,102
- Time zone: UTC+4 (AZT)
  - Summer (DST): UTC+5 (AZT)

Həmyəli (also, Həmjəli) is a village and municipality in the Shamakhi Rayon of Azerbaijan. It has a population of 1102.
