= Gobustan (town) =

Gobustan Qobustan
- City and municipality
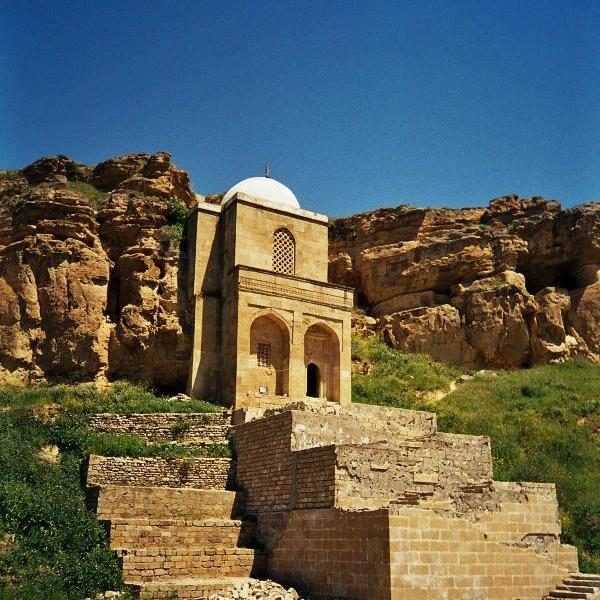

- Location within Azerbaijan
- Coordinates: 40°32′12″N 48°55′58″E
- Country: Azerbaijan
- District: Gobustan

Population (2008)
  - Total: 3,945
- Time zone: UTC+4 (AZT)

Gobustan (Azerbaijani: Qobustan) is a town and municipality and the administrative center of the Gobustan District of Azerbaijan. It has a population of 3,945.

In 2009, the town was renamed from Maraza to Gobustan. The city is home to Diri Baba Mausoleum.

== See also ==
- Ganja, Azerbaijan
- Sumqayit
- Nakhchivan
