= Qobustan, Absheron =

Qobustan
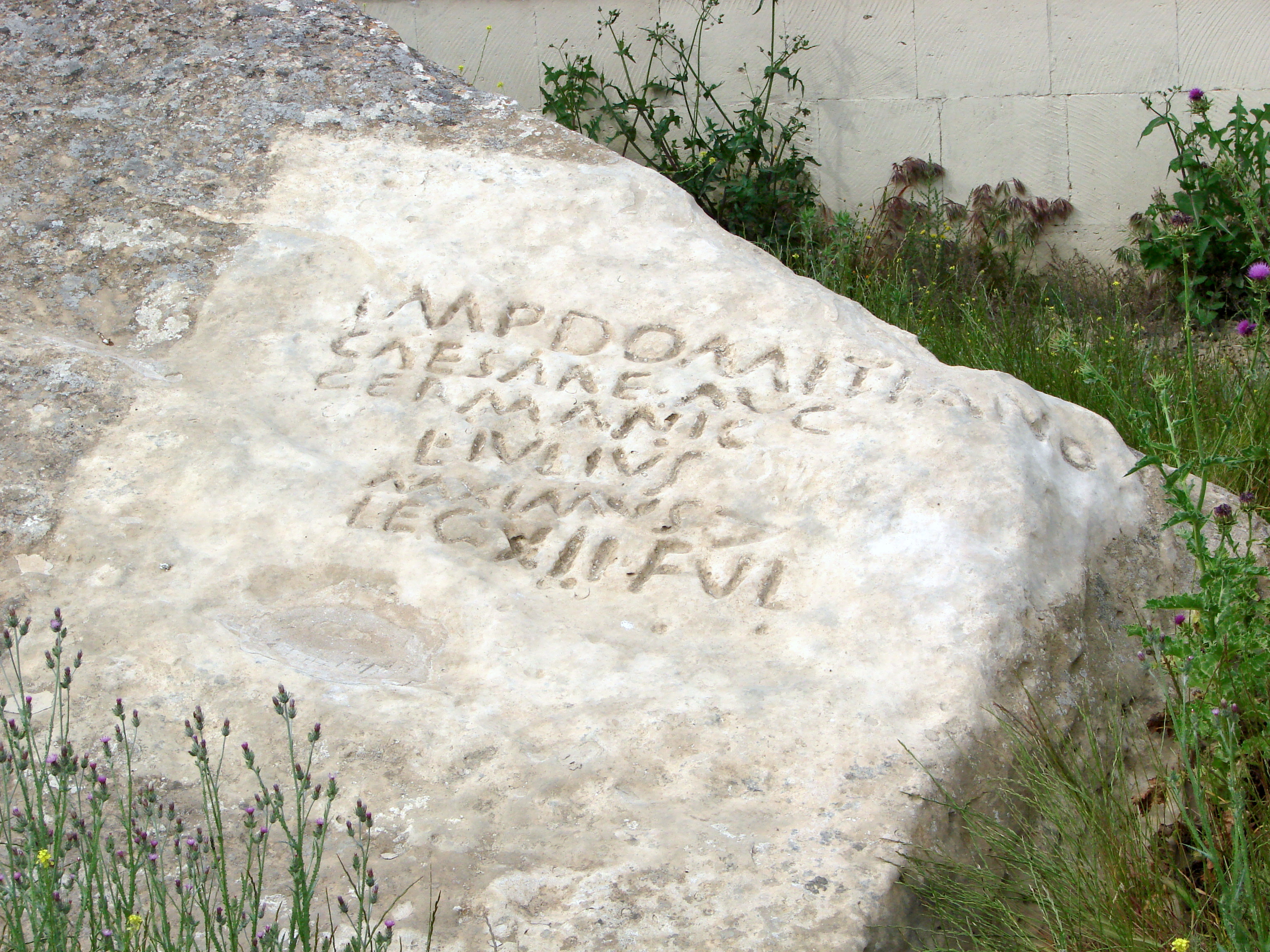
- Roman rock inscription in Qobustan, Azerbaijan.

- Location within Azerbaijan
- Country: Azerbaijan
- District: Absheron
- Municipality: Pirəkəşkül-Qobustan
- Time zone: UTC+4 (AZT)

Qobustan is a village in the municipality of Pirəkəşkül-Qobustan in the Absheron District of Azerbaijan.
