= Yekəxana, Goychay =

Yekəxana
- Municipality
- Location within Azerbaijan
- Coordinates: 40°37′33″N 48°02′37″E
- Country: Azerbaijan
- Rayon: Goychay

Population
  - Total: 714
- Time zone: UTC+4 (AZT)
  - Summer (DST): UTC+5 (AZT)

Yekəxana (also, Yekaxana) is a village and municipality in the Goychay Rayon of Azerbaijan. It has a population of 714.
