= Fatmayı =

- Municipality
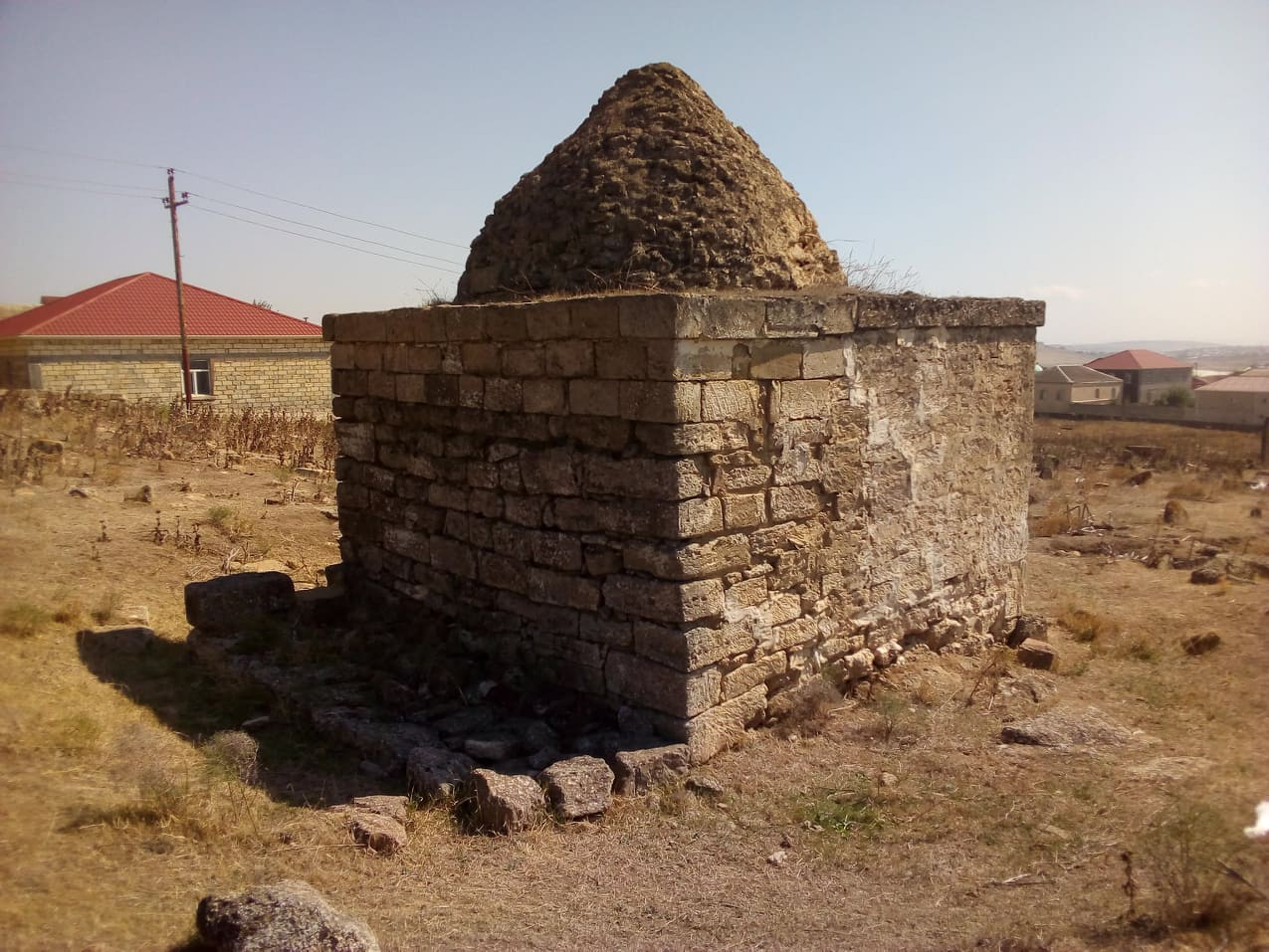

- Location within Azerbaijan
- Coordinates: 40°31′45″N 49°50′44″E
- Country: Azerbaijan
- Rayon: Absheron

Population
  - Total: 1,816
- Time zone: UTC+4 (AZT)
  - Summer (DST): UTC+5 (AZT)

Fatmayı (also, Fat’mayy, Fatmai, and Fatmay) is a village and municipality in the Absheron Rayon of Azerbaijan. It has a population of 1,816.

== Notable natives ==
- Dadash Bunyadzade — People's Commissar of Education of the Azerbaijan SSR, People's Commissar for Food of the Azerbaijan SSR (1922–1923), People's Commissar of Agriculture of the Azerbaijan SSR (1923–1930), Chairman of the Council of People's Commissars of the Azerbaijan SSR (1930–1932), People's Commissar of Agriculture of the ZSFSR (1932–1936).
