= Absheron District =

District in eastern Azerbaijan

Coordinates: 40.457182°N 49.738348°E

- District
- Map of Azerbaijan showing Absheron District
- Country: Azerbaijan
- Region: Absheron-Khizi
- Established: 4 January 1963
- Capital: Khyrdalan
- Settlements: 17

Government
  - Governor: Abdin Farzaliyev

Area
  - Total: 1,970 km^{2} (760 sq mi)

Population (2024)
  - Total: 432,816
  - Density: 220/km^{2} (569/sq mi)
- Time zone: UTC+4 (AZT)
- Postal code: 0100
- Website: www.absheron.gov.az

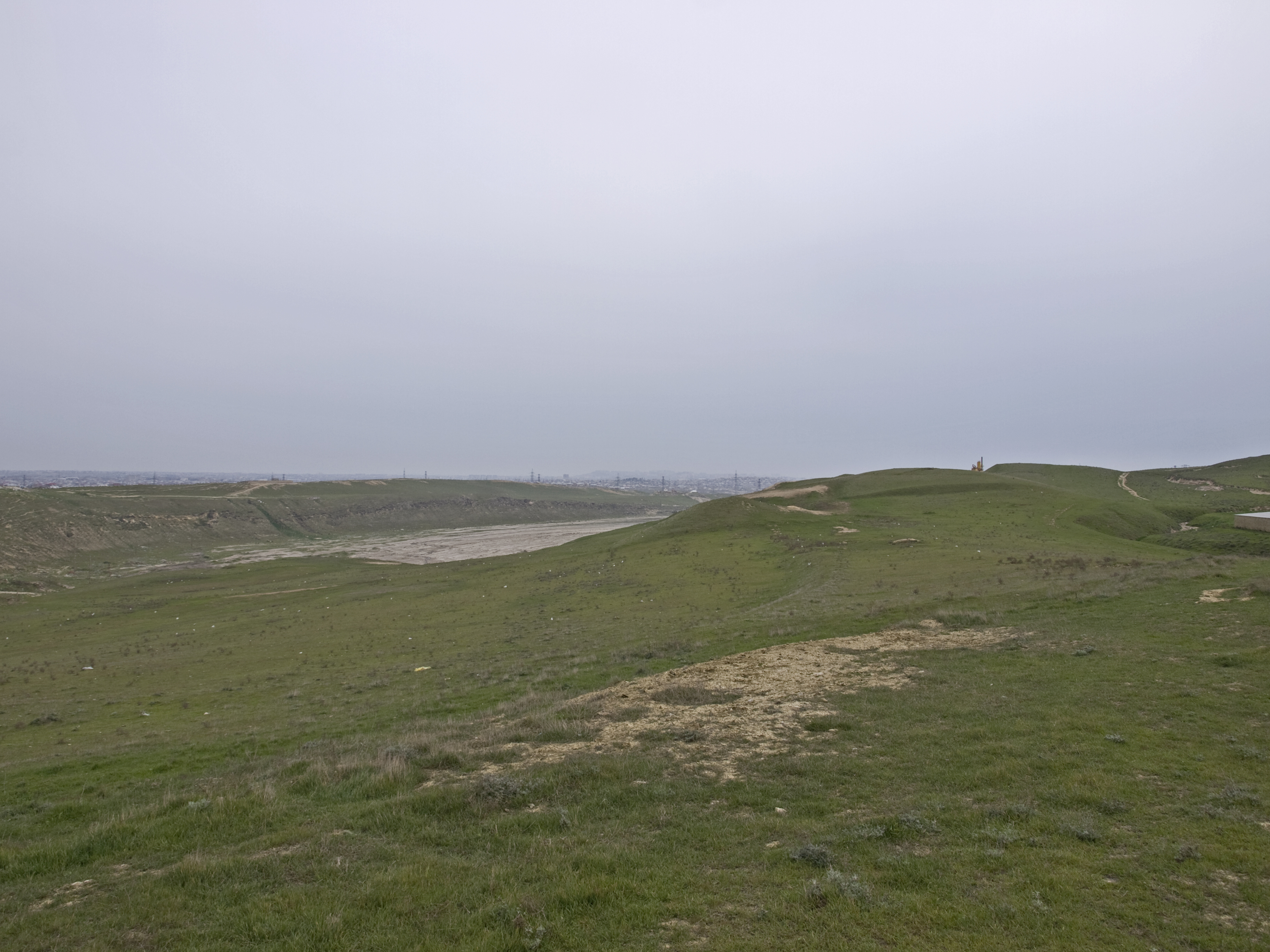
Hills from the top of Yanar Dag.

Absheron District (Azerbaijani: Abşeron rayonu) is one of the 66 districts of Azerbaijan. Located in the east of the country, it belongs to the Absheron-Khizi Economic Region. The district borders the districts of Khizi, Gobustan, Baku, Hajigabul, Salyan, and the city of Sumgait. Its capital and largest city is Khyrdalan. As of 2024, the district had a population of 432,816. Although the district shares the same name as the Absheron Peninsula, the area covered by the district is not conterminous, being further west and mostly inland.

== History ==
Absheron District was founded in 1963 by the Soviet government to ensure enough labour force, highly educated professional staff, and necessary provisions are given to enterprises and firms, kolkhozes and collective farms, poultry and agrarian industries, construction centers, scientific research institutes, and laboratories present on the territories of Baku and Sumgait.

There are many historical monuments on the territory of Absheron. For example, in the village of Ashaghy Guzdak, there are agricultural tools from the 19th century. In Goradil village, there is the Abdurrahman Mosque, pertaining to the 19th century, which was built by the villager Haji Gurban; mosques from the 18th century in Mammadli built by the Garadaghlilar family; a mosque-madrasa built in the 19th century by Haji Safarali in Novkhany, Albattin Mosque in Fatmai, which goes back to the 18th century. Aside from religious monuments, there are many monuments pertaining to the social life of people in past centuries.

For example, hamams built in the Middle Ages by Haji Kazim in Qobu village and another one built by Meshadi Imam Bakhish in Khyrdalan. Ancient wells that provided water supply to people living in this territory are still used in Ashaghy Guzdak and Khyrdalan.

Tombs from the 8th - 18th centuries are also preserved in Fatmai, Digah, Masazyr, Hokmali and Saray.

== Population ==
According to the Annual Report of the State Statistics Committee, the total population of the district was 91.2 thousand in 2000. This number increased by nearly 25 times in 2018.

Population of Absheron district by year (at the beginning of the year, thsd. persons)
	2000	2001	2002	2003	2004	2005	2006	2007	2008	2009	2010	2011	2012	2013	2014	2015	2016	2017	2018	2019	2020	2021	2024
Absheron region	91,2	101,2	111,5	122,1	132,4	142,5	152,6	169,2	179,7	189,5	191,0	192,9	195,1	197,7	200,2	202,8	205,2	207,5	210,0	212,6	214,1	215,2	432,8
urban population	66,6	74,9	83,3	92,1	109,8	117,4	126,1	140,4	149,1	157,2	158,3	159,8	161,5	163,4	165,0	166,9	168,7	170,5	172,3	174,3	175,5	176,3	319
rural population	24,6	26,3	28,2	30,0	22,6	25,1	26,5	28,8	30,6	32,3	32,7	33,1	33,6	34,3	35,2	35,9	36,5	37,0	37,7	38,3	38,6	38,9	113,8

== Culture ==
During the last year, the organization of cultural events, historical events, literary and artistic nights, and meetings and these organizations and meetings were organized and widely shown on different TV channels and media. For the protection and propagation of the intangible cultural heritage of Azerbaijan, the Absheron locale is announced as the "Capital of Mastership of Azerbaijan" in 2014 by the Ministry of Culture and Tourism. Over the year, major reconstructions were carried out at the House of Culture, and the Museum of History, and the modern children's music school in Khirdalan was built and put into operation.

== Geography and economy ==
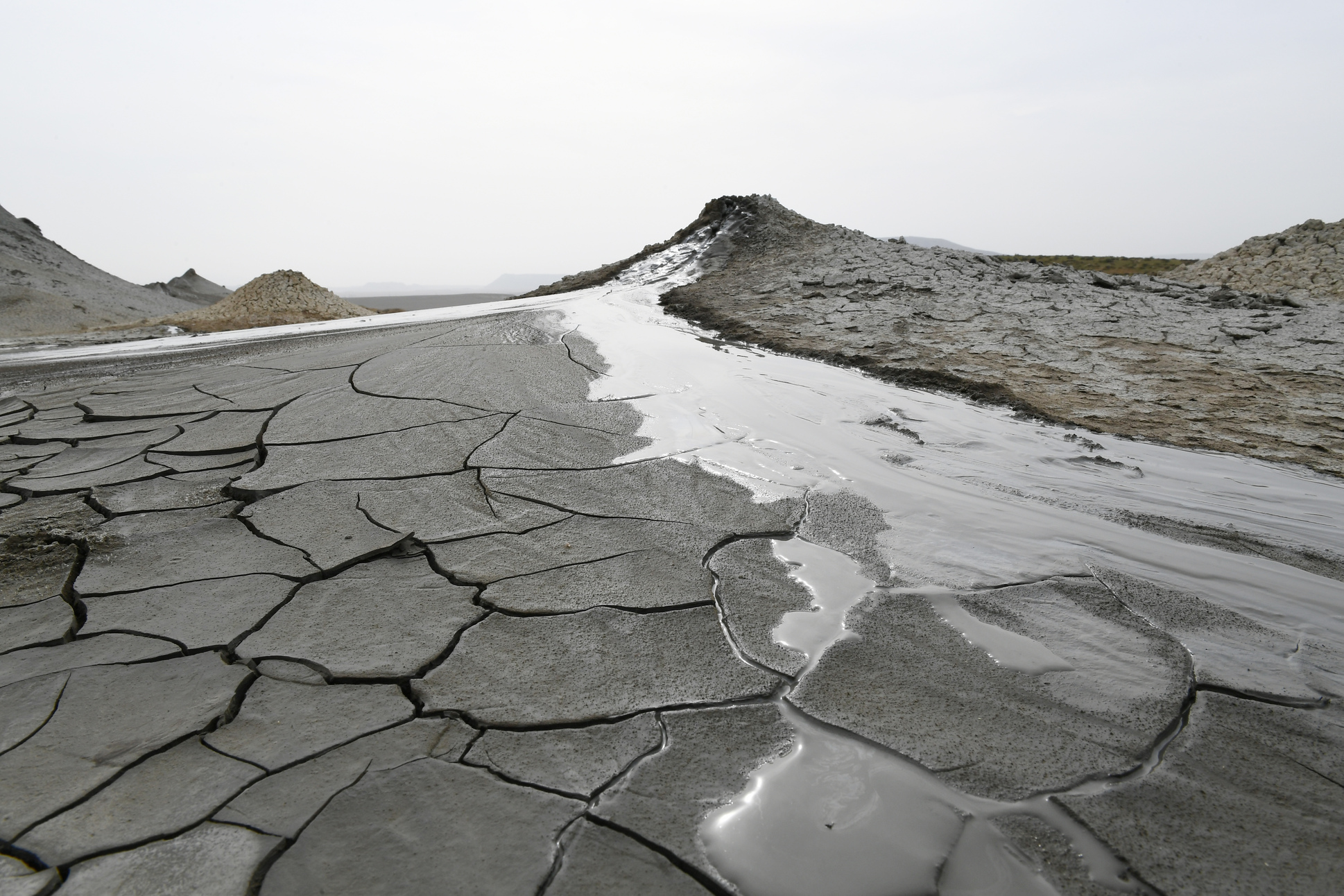
Mud volcano in Absheron District.

Absheron is situated partially on the Absheron Peninsula and partially inland. Absheron is located on the west coast of the Caspian Sea. It is located on the border with Sumgayit city, Gobustan locale, Sabunchu region, Garadagh and Binagadi regions of Baku. Absheron district is located in a dry subtropical climate zone; the climatic conditions are semi-desert and dry-desert. The basic part of its economy is agricultural production, which develops in two directions: plant growing and cattle breeding. More attention in plant growing is given to gardening and olive growing. In the sheep farming, raising the local stock of "Gala" with semi-hard or hard skin prevails.

The region is located in the southeastern part of the Greater Caucasus.

The highest point of the Absheron Peninsula is the Segerdag Mountain which is 676 meters above sea level. There are a number of salt lakes on the territory of the peninsula. The average rainfall in this area is 110–550 mm.

One of the most important parts of the landscape is mud volcanoes, hills, and landfalls. The biggest one is the Lokbatan Mud Cone, which erupted in October 2001.

The region has eight settlements, seven villages, and one city. A total of 856.8 kilometres (532.4 mi) of roads pass through the district.

=== Economy ===
Over 107 industrial entities are located in the Absheron district. Private enterprises account for 85% of industrial enterprises. 85% of them are private entities. There are 43 construction enterprises in the area. 52 industrial entities are connected to agriculture and food production, and only one to camel raising.
