= Gobustan District =

District in eastern Azerbaijan

Coordinates: 40°32′06″N 48°55′16″E

- District
- Map of Azerbaijan showing Gobustan District
- Country: Azerbaijan
- Region: Mountainous Shirvan
- Established: 24 April 1990
- Capital: Gobustan
- Settlements: 33

Government
  - Governor: Adil Mammadov

Area
  - Total: 1,370 km^{2} (530 sq mi)

Population (2020)
  - Total: 47,400
  - Density: 34.6/km^{2} (89.6/sq mi)
- Time zone: UTC+4 (AZT)
- Postal code: 3700
- Website: qobustan-ih.gov.az

Gobustan District (Azerbaijani: Qobustan rayonu) is one of the 66 districts of Azerbaijan. It is located in the east of the country, in the Mountainous Shirvan Economic Region. The district borders the districts of Shamakhi, Khizi, Absheron, and Hajigabul. Its capital and largest city is Gobustan. As of 2020, the district had a population of 47,400.

== History ==
The name "Gobustan" originated from the word "Gobu", which means "beam" in Azerbaijani. The district's administrative centre, Gobustan was known as Maraza until 2009.

The territory of the district belonged to the neighboring Shamakhi District from 1930 until 1943 and later again from 1960 until 1990, when it was re-established.

The ancient dwellings used to be in the area of present-day Gobustan, which dates back to the Stone Age.

== Infrastructure ==
There are six kindergartens in the region, and 30 general education schools. There are 23 cultural centers, 3 hospitals and medical enterprises, and 6 big and middle enterprises.

== Population ==
According to official statistics, the district of Gobustan had a population of 46,100 inhabitants at the beginning of 2018, 36,700 of whom were living in rural areas.

Population	2010	2011	2012	2013	2014	2015	2016	2017	2018	2019	2020	2021
Gobustan region	40.5	41.1	41.8	42.5	43.2	44.0	44.8	45.4	46.1	46.7	47.4	47.9
urban areas	8.2	8.3	8.5	8.6	8.8	9.0	9.1	9.3	9.4	9.5	9.7	9.8
rural areas	32.3	32.8	33.3	33.9	34.4	35.0	35.7	36.1	36.7	37.2	37.7	38.1

== Geography ==
=== Landscape ===
The territory of Gobustan ranges from the shores of the Caspian Sea to Mount Gijaki, the highest point in the eastern part of the Greater Caucasus. Peculiarities of the Gobustan landscape are the rocks of lime and sandstone in the middle territory of the district and mud volcanoes, which are located in the east part of Gobustan.

=== Climate ===
Gobustan has a semi-arid climate, with mild winters and hot summers. There are rainy seasons in early spring and late autumn. The annual precipitation is 250 mm. The western part of Gobustan is more precipitated in autumn and spring than the eastern part of Gobustan since Kura lowlands cover the western part. The highest mean temperature is observed in July (32°C), and the lowest mean temperature occurs in January (-1.6°C).

=== Flora ===
Gobustan has a rich flora with 470 different plant species; in all of Azerbaijan, there are 4000 different plant species. The vegetation of Gobustan has desert and semi-desert characteristics. Wild rose, Hibernian honeysuckle, wild pear, wild pomegranate, wild fig, and juniper can be found in Gobustan.

=== Fauna ===
There are approximately 110 wild bird species in the Gobustan region. 53 of them are included in special European conservation concerns, 9 of them are included in the Azerbaijan Red Data Book, and 9 of them are listed by the International Union for Conservation of Nature (IUNC).

There are 28 different mammal species in Gobustan. Two of them are included in the Azerbaijan Red Book, and one species is listed in the IUCN. There are two different types of amphibians and 20 different species of reptiles. Testudo graeca is included in the Red Book Data of Azerbaijan and IUCN.

== Economy ==
=== Agriculture ===
Agriculture is the core of the Gobustan economy. The most important agricultural product in the region is grain. The annual production of grain is approximately 1 ton per person. Other major agricultural products are potato, cabbage, tomato, grape, pea, sunflower, and melon.

== Court ==
Gobustan District Court was established in 1990; it is called Gobustan District People's Court and is subordinate to the Ministry of Justice of Azerbaijan SSR.
