= Subatan-Diza (archeological site) =

Archaeological site in Azerbaijan

Sumbatan-Diza
- Subatan-Diza
- Location within Azerbaijan
- Interactive map of Sumbatan-Diza
- 38°56′52″N 45°49′32″E
- Type: Settlement
- Location: Mount Subatan
- Region: Ordubad District

History
- Built: ≈End of second to first millennia BC

Site notes
- Area: 5 hectares (12 acres)
- Archaeologists: Nakhchivan Archaeological Expedition
- Discovered: 1976
- Condition: Ruins

Sumbatan-Diza, also called Subatan-Diza, is an archaeological site in Azerbaijan. It is located in Ordubad region, south-west of Sabirkend, on the right bank of Gilanchay, 800 m (0.80 km) north of Ordubad-Nakhchivan road, on the mountain of the same name, covering Rasul and Suleyman valleys.

== History ==
Archaeological research indicates that the Subatan-Diza settlement dates back to the end of the second millennium BC or the beginning of the first millennium, and covered the peaks and slopes of Mount Subatan. Originally the center of tribal associations, this 6–7 hectares (15–17 acres) village has expanded to become a 20 hectares (49 acres) settlement over the centuries. In Azerbaijan, this type of rural area was gradually strengthened by defensive walls and turned into a city. At the end of the second millennium BC, Subatan-Diza was one of the cities surrounded by defensive walls. Although the city of Subatan-Diza was destroyed several times, it was rebuilt and existed as a city until the Sassanid period.For the second time after the Achaemenid period, it was severely damaged by the Sassanids, and Sumbatan-Diza lost its function as a city and became a small settlement. This ancient city has preserved its name to this day. Although the settlement was renamed Sabirkendi in 1936, the people of the surrounding villages still call it Subatan-Diza.

== Description ==
Subatan is surrounded on three sides by high mountains, and on the Gilanchay side by a double defensive wall. It is crossed by the Gilanchay River on the east and the Yayci River on the west. The main part is located on the mountain. The area is about 5 hectares (12 acres). The settlement is located in the oval-shaped collapse on the river side of the mountain. The open side of the collapse towards the river - the eastern part of the settlement - is covered with large stones. The length of this cycloptic structure is 18 metres (59 ft). On the east side of the settlement, there is another wall besides this one. On the outer surface of the wall (towards the river) the rectangular protrusions survived at a height of 1.3–1.5 m (4 ft 3 in – 4 ft 11 in). The rest of the mountain on the west side of Sumbatan is a steep cliff. Therefore, the settlement is surrounded by two layers of defensive walls on the east side. The second wall surrounding the settlement extends another 15–16 m (49–52 ft) to the south. It is not yet clear for what purpose this part of the mountain with a steep slope surrounded by a defensive wall. The necropolis of Sumbatan settlement could be located here. However, the presence of defensive walls suggests that there is a second settlement here. It is interesting that here the surroundings of several tons of large stones that fell from the top of the mountain were decorated with stones of different sizes in a circular and rectangular shape. It has not yet been determined whether the remains of these buildings, which have been observed with the naked eye in several parts of the mountain, belong to graves or settlements. The corridor, which begins at the entrance on the north side of the defensive wall, continues to the top of Mount Sumbatan. A continuation of this corridor was also discovered in the second excavation area near the top of the mountain. Interestingly, the stone floor of the corridor in the second excavation area - 5.8 m^{2} (62 sq ft) - also survived. It is clear that this corridor, which starts on the east side of Mount Sumbatan and continues to the top of the mountain.

== Etymology ==
In historical literature, the name of the village was also used as Subatan-Diza. Subatan-Diza toponym is one of the oldest toponyms in Gilanchay valley. The word sumbatan consists of two parts: "sum" and "bat". The word "bat" means "village", "city" or simply "dwelling place". The word is in Elamite, and is the same as the word "bat" added to the end of the names of towns and villages in this language. The word "abad" added to the end of the names of cities and villages in Persian is also taken from the Elamite language. The Subatan monument is located in a village called Subatan-diza (until 1936). The word "diza" added to the name of the village is noteworthy here. It is known that this word is also taken from the Elamite word "tiz" - fortress. The word "diza" in the Pahlavi language is also taken from the Elamite language and used in the sense of a fortress. During the Sassanids, the Nakhchivan fortress was called "Kuhandiz" - ie "mountain fortress". In many parts of the Nakhchivan Autonomous Republic, and especially in the villages around the Gilanchay, there is the word "diza" in the names of several ("Double-diza", "Head-diza", "Kalantar-diza", "Sabir-diza"). The archaic word "diza" is also preserved in the present name of the village (Sabir-Diza). Thus, the meaning of the words "bat" (village or city) and "diza" (fortress) in the name of Sumbatan-diza becomes clear. The main problem here is the word "Sum" used in the front part of the name. The closest name to Sumbatan is found in Assyrian sources. G.A. Melikishvili shows that the name Sumbi is used most often together with Manna. While suggesting that the name Sumbatan may be used as the Sun (m) bi mentioned in the cuneiform inscriptions. It refers not only to the phonetic similarity of the names, but also to the geographical position of the toponyms and the correspondence of the historical source with the period of the monument.Sumbi (or Sunbi), Mehri, Aza, etc. in the Assyrian and Urartian cuneiform inscriptions. allows localization of toponyms (ethnotoponyms) in the territory of Manna, especially along the Araz. All three toponyms still remain on the left bank of the Araz River. In the middle reaches of the Araz, especially in the territory of Nakhchivan, BC. The end of the second millennium BC Many toponyms of the first half of the first millennium have survived to the present day, as well as with minor changes. Examples are Nuvedi (Nou-vedi), Mehri, Ordubad (Arduba), Vanand (Vanant), Aza, Maraza, Sakkarsu, Arazin (Archini), Sum (n) batan, Didivar, Sharur, Max (z), Tumas, Akhura, Vedi, Vedibasar names can be specified. Many of these toponyms are mentioned in the Avesta. "It is assumed that the word Sum is the same as the etymology of the word" Sumer ". In the etymology of the word Sumer, O. Suleymanov's views are noteworthy. We give the main parts of his thoughts as they are: "There is such a poetic expression in Gultekin's monument:" The place of Turkish victory - Subi ". Literally translated: "Holy Turkic Earth-Water", poetic translation means "Holy Turkic country" ... "Subyer" - the lexical molecule of the name of the most ancient country, perhaps, originated from these atoms? Or was there such a place in the territories later settled by the Turks - in Siberia, Mongolia? Mongolian legends speak of the double-topped Mount Suber (Sumer, Sumber). This mountain was so high that it could not be covered by water during the flood of Noah. According to legend, when the world was created, there was water everywhere, and two Sumerian mountains stretched out of the water. A more interesting idea in O. Suleymanov's research is that the ancient Turkish hieroglyph denoting place (yir) is derived from the ancient Sumerian symbol "kur" - mountain and "kir" - land, country.

== Research ==
The monument was registered in 1976 by the Kharaba Gilan detachment of the Nakhchivan Archaeological Expedition. In 2008-2012, the Kharaba-Gilan archeological expedition conducted research in the Sumbatan-diza settlement. In 2010, on the top of the mountain, a 480 m^{2} (5,200 sq ft) archaeological excavation in the area showed that there was a complex of religious and administrative buildings. The complex has been repeatedly destroyed in ancient, medieval and modern times. Each time it was demolished, it was restored so that the traces of restoration are more clearly visible, especially on the eastern side of the complex. Compared to the residential part of the complex, the foundations of the walls in the part facing the steep cliff survived at a height of 1.8–2.0 m (5 ft 11 in – 6 ft 7 in) from the surface of that period. After the last destruction - around the 3rd century AD, the purpose of construction was changed. In the central part of this cyclopic wall there are pieces of rock weighing up to 5–8 t (4.9–7.9 long tons; 5.5–8.8 short tons).

During the excavation, it was found that the rock fragments on the top of the mountain were used effectively during the development of the defensive wall. The walls of the complex were also made of huge pieces of rock, and mud was used as a hardener in their construction. The space between the large stones worked on both sides of the walls, which are 2–3 m (6 ft 7 in – 9 ft 10 in) wide, is filled with stones of different sizes and mud. In this case, the largest stones are placed not on the side of the dwelling, but on the opposite side of the wall - on the side where the danger is expected. Four risalites (1.5 m (4 ft 11 in) wide and up to 3 m (9.8 ft) long) on the east side of the defensive wall have partially survived. The gaps between the risalits were closed by additional walls 1.5 metres (4 ft 11 in) high, which significantly increased the defense capacity of the complex. If we take into account that this side of Mount Sumbatan is a steep slope up to 50 metres (160 ft) high and the part of the slope towards the top is a steep cliff 9–10 metres (30–33 ft) high, then it becomes clear how strong the complex's defenses are. From time to time, huge rocks on the eastern side of Mount Sumbatan flew down and rolled down and covered the buildings here. Although some of these 5–10 t (4.9–9.8 long tons; 5.5–11.0 short tons) rock fragments remain under the eroded soil from time to time, most of them are still visible. When this part of the mountain collapsed, the buildings of the complex were destroyed. For this reason, it was not possible to determine how the complex was completed on the east side during the excavation.

Based on the structure of the buttresses and the construction of one-sided defensive walls at the foot of the mountain, it can be assumed that the gaps between the rocks and the surrounding protrusions were reinforced with stone. In general, we see analogues of the architectural style and construction techniques of Sumbatan fortress in the Median fortresses. Archaeological excavations in the Sumbatan necropolis showed that the necropolis completely covers the Subatan valley.

== Archaeological finds ==
Many valuable finds have been discovered in the Subatan settlement. Ceramic samples of the end of the 2nd millennium BC-1st millennium BC, stone tools, tools with a circular hole in the middle, which is considered to be the head of smell, were found here. Examples of ceramics consist of red and gray clay (some painted red) tableware and the remains of thick-walled, large jugs. The necropolis of Subatan settlement is located on a low hill to the west of the settlement. Archaeological excavations on the north-eastern side of Mount Subatan have uncovered the remains of a cyclopic wall 23.5 m (77 ft) long and 3–3.5 m (9.8–11.5 ft) wide, built of large mountain stones. The eastern part of the wall is more exposed to destruction as it faces the mountain slope. 40–50 cm (16–20 in) down during archeological research in the settlement a layer of ash was found. Tea stones, ceramics and osteological remains were found in the ash layer. Among the osteological finds are the bones of cattle. Fragments of large farm cubes were found in three places in the complex, in one of which pieces of rock salt were found. It is likely that in ancient times, rock salt was brought from the Nakhchivan mines and distributed or sold to the surrounding settlements. The vast majority of pottery found during archeological excavations on Mount Sumbatan consists of fragments of well-baked pink clay pots. The dishes are mostly covered with pink and gray angob. The tablecloths have geometric patterns in black, red and brown, and arches, corners and convex ornaments with folded ends. The handles are mostly petal-shaped. Tubular vessels are very rare, but the tubes of teapot-type vessels, which were widespread in the Early Iron Age, are found. Triangles with double parallel lines were drawn from the middle of the body of the black clay pots to the mouth and filled with diagonal lines between them. Fragments of elegantly made brown stone dishes attract attention.

== Graves ==
Many graves were discovered during archeological excavations in the Sumbatan-Diza settlement, of which only two were studied. They are similar in shape to the recent tombs in the Plovdag necropolis. The chambers of the tombs consist of stone boxes. There are stones around it. According to the surviving parts, the area covered by the rocks covers an area of 2.5 by 3.2 m (8 ft 2 in by 10 ft 6 in).

=== During research ===
The cover stones of the first tomb are not found. This is a pit grave belonging to a child aged 12–14. Around the cube there are two rows of cromlex made of different rocks (also found in river stones). The condition of the stone and soil in the middle of the cromlex suggests that the tomb is hilly. So, unlike neatly arranged stones, these stones look like they were poured by hand. After cleaning the surface of the tomb at the level of cromlex stones, the body of the household jar was found at a depth of 24–25 cm (9.4–9.8 in). The neck of the pink clay jar is on the east side. However, the dead jar was placed on the side of the seat, not on the side of the mouth. It is known that the seat and the part close to it were made separately. Therefore, breaking this part was not so difficult. Both the mouth of the cube and the broken part of the seat were covered with stones. However, although the broken part was covered with stones and plastered with mud, later some parts were rubbed with moisture and the jar was filled with soil. The soil came in along with the rainwater. During the excavation, the sludge brought by the rainwater was observed many times near the mouth of the jar. There are two holes in the body of the cube. The mounds of earth leaking from these holes were clearly visible. The body of the cube was cracked. This probably happened during the earthquake. After the fractures at the top were removed, the inside of the jar was cleaned. The skeleton is well preserved. A bowl was found on the back of his skull. Its mouth is vertical and its edges are pointed. These pink clay bowls are typical of antiquity. No equipment was found around the corpse other than this one clay pot.

Only the southwest corner of the second tomb survived. The rest of the tomb was washed away by snow and rain and flowed into the ravine. While cleaning the surviving part, a fragment of red-painted clay pottery was found. Four types of graves were found and studied in Sumbatan settlement. There were different types of graves in pre-Islamic Azerbaijani cities, the most common of which are pit graves.
