= Nuvedi =

Nuvedi may refer to:

- Nüvədi, Azerbaijan
- Nuvedi, Iran
- Nüvədi, Lankaran (disambiguation)
