= Tütəpəştə =

- Municipality
- Location within Azerbaijan
- Coordinates: 38°43′N 48°49′E
- Country: Azerbaijan
- Rayon: Lankaran

Population
  - Total: 940
- Time zone: UTC+4 (AZT)
  - Summer (DST): UTC+5 (AZT)

Tütəpəştə (also, Tütəpeştə and Tutapeshta) is a village and municipality in the Lankaran Rayon of Azerbaijan. It has a population of 940.
