= Qurumba =

Village in Azerbaijan

Coordinates: 38°43′N 48°46′E

Qurumba (also, Quruba) is a village and municipality in the Lankaran Rayon of Azerbaijan. It has a population of 837.
