= Osakücə =

- Municipality
- Location within Azerbaijan
- Coordinates: 38.813°N 48.714°E
- Country: Azerbaijan
- Rayon: Lankaran

Population
  - Total: 6,332
- Time zone: UTC+4 (AZT)
  - Summer (DST): UTC+5 (AZT)

Osakücə (also Osaküçə, Asakyudzha, Osakudzha, or Osakyudzha) is a village and municipality in the Lankaran Rayon of Azerbaijan. It has a population of 6,332. The municipality consists of the villages of Osakücə, Sinovli, Moloja, Tatova, Pambəyi, and Naftoruon.
