= Seydəkəran =

- Municipality
- Location within Azerbaijan
- Coordinates: 38°42′N 48°52′E
- Country: Azerbaijan
- Rayon: Lankaran

Population
  - Total: 1,026
- Time zone: UTC+4 (AZT)
  - Summer (DST): UTC+5 (AZT)

Seydəkəran (also, Seyidəkəran, Seydakeran, and Seyde-Karan) is a village and municipality in the Lankaran Rayon of Azerbaijan. It has a population of 1,026.
