= Küvənil =

- Municipality
- Location within Azerbaijan
- Coordinates: 38°43′N 48°50′E
- Country: Azerbaijan
- Rayon: Lankaran

Population
  - Total: 1,205
- Time zone: UTC+4 (AZT)
  - Summer (DST): UTC+5 (AZT)

Küvənil (also, Güvənil, Kuvanil’, and Kuvenil’) is a village and municipality in the Lankaran Rayon of Azerbaijan. It has a population of 1,205.
