= Səpnəkəran =

- Municipality
- Location within Azerbaijan
- Coordinates: 38°38′10″N 48°47′49″E
- Country: Azerbaijan
- Rayon: Lankaran

Population
  - Total: 1,481
- Time zone: UTC+4 (AZT)
  - Summer (DST): UTC+5 (AZT)

Səpnəkəran (also, Sapnakeran and Sapnaperan) is a village and municipality in the Lankaran Rayon of Azerbaijan. It has a population of 1,481.
