= Pambəyi =

- Location within Azerbaijan
- Coordinates: 38°48′59″N 48°42′20″E
- Country: Azerbaijan
- Rayon: Lankaran
- Municipality: Osakücə
- Time zone: UTC+4 (AZT)
  - Summer (DST): UTC+5 (AZT)

Pambəyi (along with, Pambahi, Pambagi, and Pombagi) is a village that forms a part of the municipality of Osakücə, Azerbaijan.
