= Baliton =

- Municipality
- Location within Azerbaijan
- Coordinates: 38°47′47″N 48°37′15″E
- Country: Azerbaijan
- Rayon: Lankaran

Population
  - Total: 1,096
- Time zone: UTC+4 (AZT)
  - Summer (DST): UTC+5 (AZT)

Baliton (also, Boliton, Bəliton, Baleton, and Beleton) is a village and municipality in the Lankaran Rayon of Azerbaijan. It has a population of 1,096. The municipality consists of the villages of Baliton, Horavenc, and Şivlik.
