= Horavenc =

Coordinates: 38°48′N 48°38′E

Horavenc is a village in the municipality of Baliton in the Lankaran Rayon of Azerbaijan.
