= Moğonojoba =

Village in Lankaran Rayon, Azerbaijan

Coordinates: 38°41′N 48°48′E

Moğonojoba is a village and municipality in the Lankaran Rayon of Azerbaijan. It has a population of 637.
