= Şirinsu =

- Village
- Location within Azerbaijan
- Coordinates: 38°55′N 48°48′E
- Country: Azerbaijan
- Rayon: Lankaran
- Time zone: UTC+4 (AZT)
  - Summer (DST): UTC+5 (AZT)

Şirinsu is a village in the municipality of Liman in the Lankaran Rayon of Azerbaijan.
