= Xanbulan =

Coordinates: 38°40′N 48°48′E

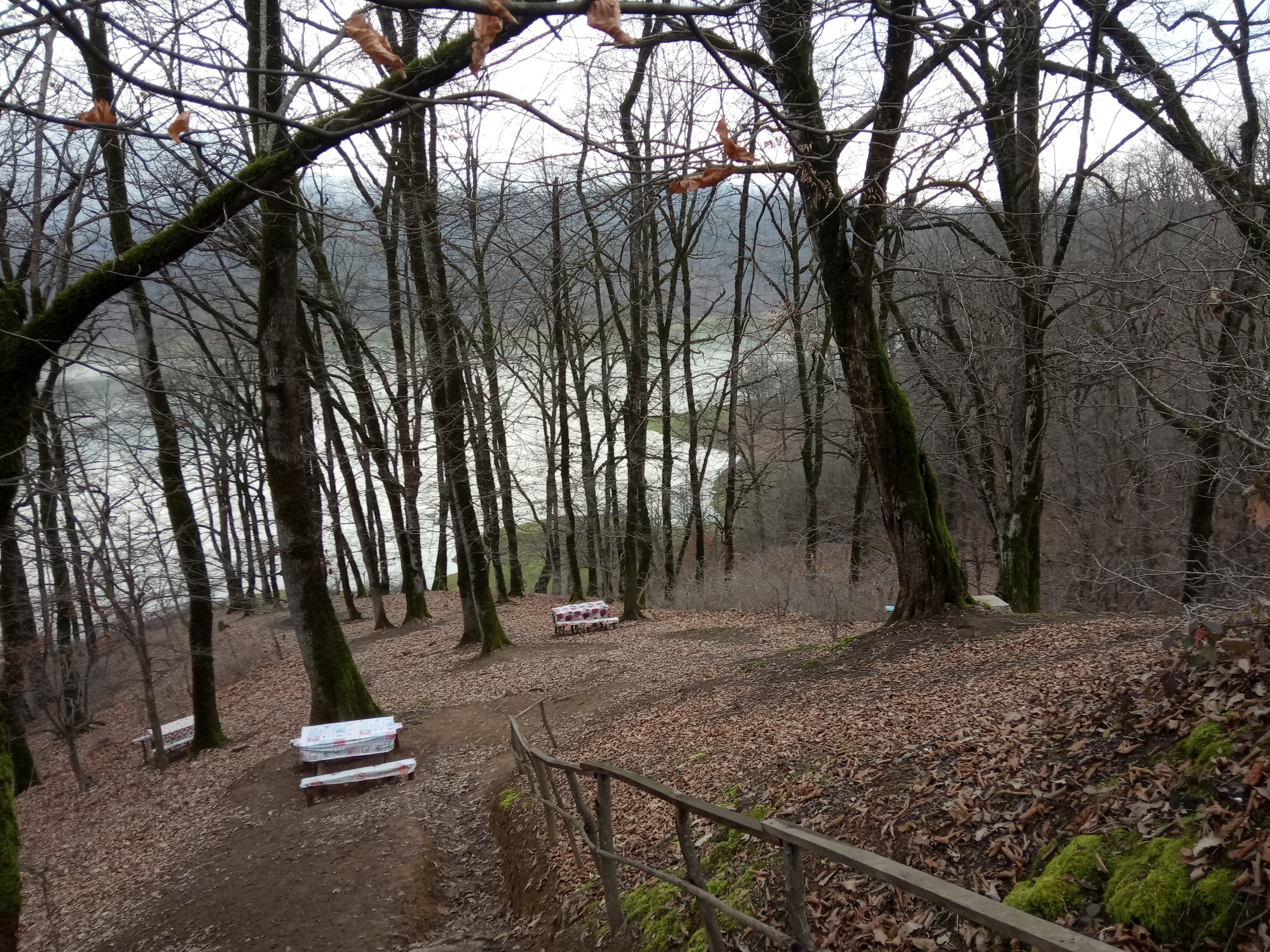
Forest Xanbulan

Xanbulan is a village and municipality in the Lankaran Rayon of Azerbaijan. It has a population of 1,303. The municipality consists of the villages of Xanbulan and Sərinbulaq.
