= Moloja =

- Location within Azerbaijan
- Coordinates: 38°49′22″N 48°40′39″E
- Country: Azerbaijan
- Rayon: Lankaran
- Municipality: Osakücə
- Time zone: UTC+4 (AZT)
  - Summer (DST): UTC+5 (AZT)

Moloja (also, Molozh’ya and Molozha) is a village in the Lankaran Rayon of Azerbaijan. The village forms part of the municipality of Osakücə.
