= Tuado =

- Municipality
- Location within Azerbaijan
- Coordinates: 38°53′47″N 48°33′59″E
- Country: Azerbaijan
- Rayon: Lankaran

Population
  - Total: 585
- Time zone: UTC+4 (AZT)
  - Summer (DST): UTC+5 (AZT)

Tuado (also, Tşado) is a village and municipality in the Lankaran Rayon of Azerbaijan. It has a population of 585.
