= Kənarmeşə =

- Municipality
- Location within Azerbaijan
- Coordinates: 38°42′03″N 48°51′58″E
- Country: Azerbaijan
- Rayon: Lankaran

Population
  - Total: 1,413
- Time zone: UTC+4 (AZT)
  - Summer (DST): UTC+5 (AZT)

Kənarmeşə (also, Kənarəmeşə and Kenaramesha) is a village and municipality in the Lankaran Rayon of Azerbaijan. It has a population of 1,413. The municipality consists of the villages of Kənarmeşə and Şilim.
