= Bürcəli =

Coordinates: 38°40′N 48°48′E

Bürcəli is a village and municipality located in the Lankaran Rayon of Azerbaijan. Situated in the southern part of the country and has a population of 2,104.
