= Şilim =

Coordinates: 38°42′N 48°51′E

Şilim is a village in the municipality of Kənarmeşə in the Lankaran Rayon of Azerbaijan.
