= Mikolan =

- Village
- Location within Azerbaijan
- Coordinates: 38°42′N 48°47′E
- Country: Azerbaijan
- Rayon: Lankaran
- Time zone: UTC+4 (AZT)
  - Summer (DST): UTC+5 (AZT)

Mikolan is a village in the municipality of Yuxarı Nüvədi in the Lankaran Rayon of Azerbaijan.
