= Türkəncil =

- Municipality
- Location within Azerbaijan
- Coordinates: 38°50′N 48°34′E
- Country: Azerbaijan
- Rayon: Lankaran

Population
  - Total: 551
- Time zone: UTC+4 (AZT)
  - Summer (DST): UTC+5 (AZT)

Türkəncil (also, Turkyandzhil and Turkyandzhil’) is a village and municipality in the Lankaran Rayon of Azerbaijan. It has a population of 551. The municipality consists of the villages of Türkəncil and Qodəsə.
