= Xanlıqlı =

Coordinates: 38°46′N 48°46′E

Xanlıqlı is a village in the municipality of Haftoni in the Lankaran Rayon of Azerbaijan.
