= Talışlı =

Coordinates: 38°45′N 48°47′E

Talışlı is a village in the municipality of Haftoni in the Lankaran Rayon of Azerbaijan.
