= Xolmili =

- Municipality
- Location within Azerbaijan
- Coordinates: 38°40′44″N 48°51′49″E
- Country: Azerbaijan
- Rayon: Lankaran

Population
  - Total: 2,336
- Time zone: UTC+4 (AZT)
  - Summer (DST): UTC+5 (AZT)

Xolmili (also, Kholmili) is a village and municipality in the Lankaran Rayon of Azerbaijan.

== Population ==
According to the latest statistics, its population is approximately 2,336 people.
