= Miandy =

- Location within Azerbaijan
- Coordinates: 38°54′N 48°39′E
- Country: Azerbaijan
- Rayon: Lankaran
- Time zone: UTC+4 (AZT)
  - Summer (DST): UTC+5 (AZT)

Miandy is a village in the Lankaran Rayon of Azerbaijan.
