= Xarxatan =

- Municipality
- Location within Azerbaijan
- Coordinates: 38°51′N 48°44′E
- Country: Azerbaijan
- Rayon: Lankaran

Population
  - Total: 1,856
- Time zone: UTC+4 (AZT)
  - Summer (DST): UTC+5 (AZT)

Xarxatan (also, Kharkhatan) is a village and municipality in the Lankaran Rayon of Azerbaijan. It has a population of 1,856.
