= Sərinbulaq =

Coordinates: 38°42′N 48°47′E

Sərinbulaq is a village in the municipality of Xanbulan in the Lankaran Rayon of Azerbaijan.
