= Köhnə Gəgir =

- Municipality
- Location within Azerbaijan
- Coordinates: 38°52′24″N 48°35′54″E
- Country: Azerbaijan
- Rayon: Lankaran

Population
  - Total: 274
- Time zone: UTC+4 (AZT)
  - Summer (DST): UTC+5 (AZT)

Köhnə Gəgir (also, Këgna Gegir and Konagager) a village and the least populous municipality in the Lankaran Rayon of Azerbaijan. It has a population of 274.
