= Separadi =

Separadi or Siperady or Separady may refer to:

- Separadi, Lankaran, Azerbaijan
- Separadi, Yardymli, Azerbaijan
