= Şağlaser =

- Municipality
- Location within Azerbaijan
- Coordinates: 38°51′53″N 48°44′30″E
- Country: Azerbaijan
- Rayon: Lankaran

Population
  - Total: 4,148
- Time zone: UTC+4 (AZT)
  - Summer (DST): UTC+5 (AZT)

Şağlaser (also, Şağlasər and Shaglaser) is a village and municipality in the Lankaran Rayon of Azerbaijan. It has a population of 4,148.
