= Ramin Deko =

Azerbaijani journalist

- Ramin Deкo
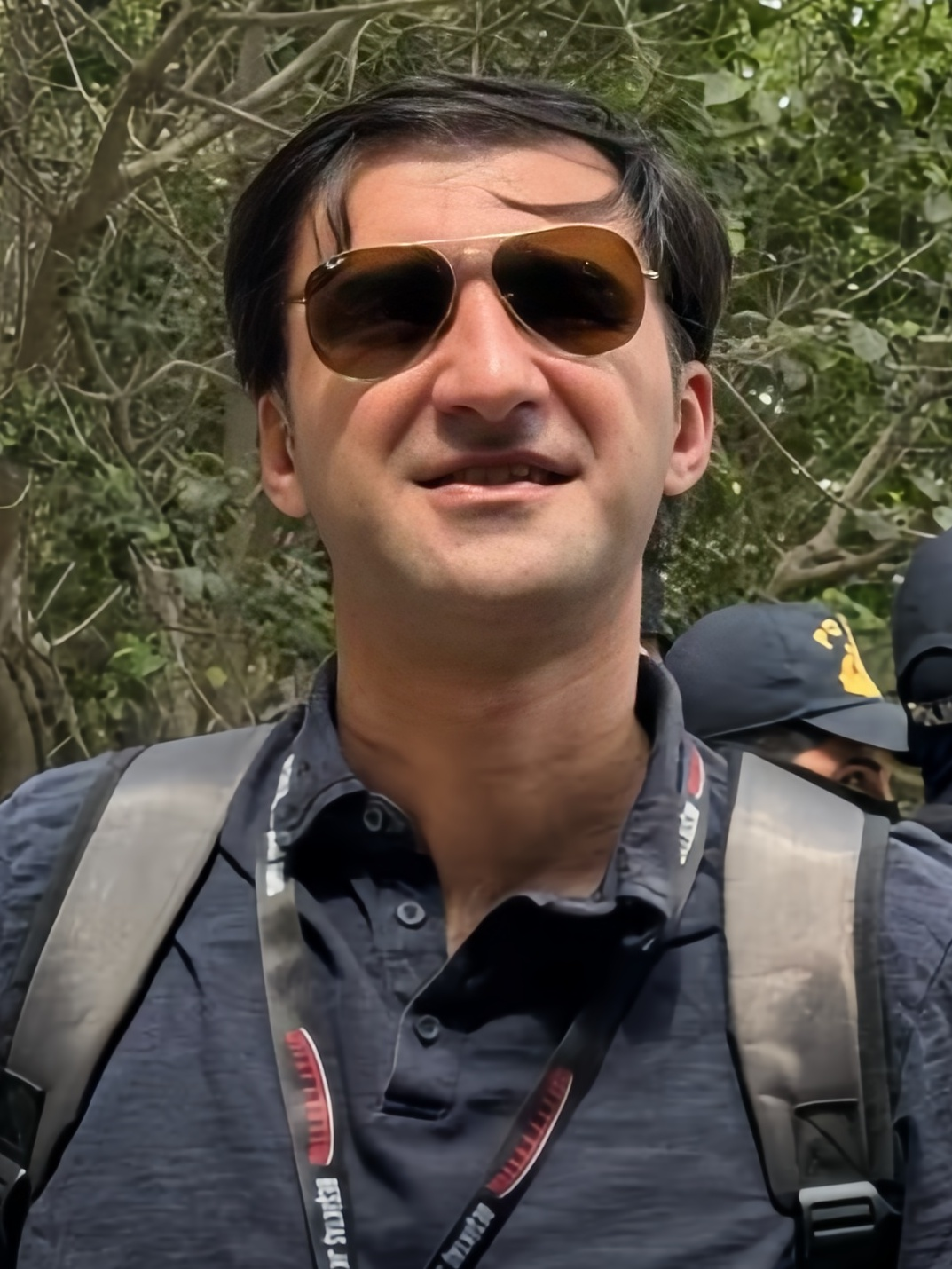
- Ramin Deko in 2023
- Born: February 18, 1987 (age 39); Liman, Azerbaijan SSR
- Citizenship: Azerbaijan
- Education: Azerbaijan Social and Political University (B)
- Occupations: journalist, political prisoner
- Years active: 2008–present

Ramin Deco (full name: Ramin Natig oglu Jabrayilzade; born February 18, 1987, in Liman, Azerbaijan) is an Azerbaijani journalist and political prisoner. He worked as a correspondent for the Azadliq newspaper from 2008 to 2016 and for the Azerbaijani Service of Radio Free Europe/Radio Liberty (RFE/RL) from 2016 to 2023. Since 2023, he has worked as a journalist for Meydan TV.

Shortly after beginning his journalism career at a young age, he became the target of severe pressure. On April 3, 2011, he was abducted by unidentified individuals and forced into a car. During a conversation lasting approximately four hours, he was advised to stop posting anti-government statements on social media. He was also offered a job at the pro-government newspaper New Azerbaijan instead of the opposition-oriented Azadliq newspaper. After Ramin Deco made the incident public, he was assaulted by unidentified individuals in the evening of April 4, who confronted him with the words, “Haven’t you learned your lesson?” Although a criminal investigation was opened into the incident, those responsible for the attack on the journalist were never identified.

Throughout his journalistic career, he has authored hundreds of reports. Between 2011 and 2024, in the course of his professional work, he was repeatedly detained and beaten by representatives of law enforcement and state security agencies. His video camera and other equipment were also unlawfully confiscated.

On December 6, 2024, amid a wave of journalist arrests in Azerbaijan, he was detained by police alongside other Meydan TV journalists. He was subsequently investigated as a suspect in a criminal case initiated by the Baku City Main Police Department. On December 8, he was remanded in custody by a ruling of the Khatai District Court. During the preliminary investigation, more than ten court hearings were held at both the first-instance and appellate levels. None of the motions submitted by the defence was granted, while motions filed by the investigator of the Baku City Main Police Department and applications submitted by the prosecutor responsible for procedural oversight of the preliminary investigation were generally approved. On August 29, 2025, he was formally charged under seven provisions of the Criminal Code: Articles 192.3.2, 193-1.3.1, 193-1.3.2, 206.4, 213.2.1, 320.1, and 320.2. These charges concerned illegal entrepreneurship, the legalization of property obtained through criminal activity, smuggling, tax evasion, forgery of official documents, and the knowing use of forged documents. Ramin Jabrayilzade has pleaded not guilty to the charges. The Institute for Peace and Democracy (IPD) has designated him a “political prisoner.” Several prominent international human rights organizations, including Human Rights Watch and Amnesty International, as well as Reporters Without Borders, the US Department of State, and the European Parliament, have condemned the arrests of Ramin Deco and other detained journalists and called on the Azerbaijani government to release them immediately.

From December 2024 to December 2025, he was held at Pre-Trial Detention Centre No. 3, operated by the Penitentiary Service of the Ministry of Justice. Since December 2025, he has been held at the Baku Pre-Trial Detention Centre.

== Early life ==
Ramin Natig oghlu Jabrayilzade was born on February 18, 1987, in the city of Liman.

From 1993 to 2004, he attended secondary school no. 1 named after I. I. Mahmudov in Liman.

From 2004 to 2008, he studied at Azerbaijan University of Social and Political Sciences.

== Journalism career ==
Ramin Jabrayilzade began his journalism career at the age of 20 as a correspondent for the Azadliq newspaper.

From 2008 to 2016, he worked as a correspondent for Azadliq newspaper.

From 2016 to 2023, he worked as a correspondent for the Azerbaijani Service of Radio Free Europe/Radio Liberty (RFE/RL).

From 2023 until the day of his arrest, he worked as a journalist for Meydan TV.

Ramin Jabrayilzade is a devoted supporter of FC Barcelona. Inspired by Deco, a former player of the club, he adopted the byline “Ramin Deco” for his journalistic work.

Since 2008, Ramin Deco has authored hundreds of news articles and reports. He has brought electoral irregularities to public attention during presidential, parliamentary, and municipal elections, and covered rallies, demonstrations, and social protests, particularly cases involving the unlawful demolition of citizens’ homes.

In February 2013, following the mysterious death of soldier Seymur Allahverdiyev, state officials stated that the soldier had died by suicide. However, Ramin Deco filmed video footage of the soldier’s body and brought to public attention evidence suggesting that the death was a crime rather than a suicide. The incident sparked widespread public outcry in the country.

Throughout his journalistic career, he has been detained by police on several occasions, abducted, beaten, and subjected to surveillance and harassment. He has also been fined repeatedly over articles he authored.

In September 2015, he was questioned by the Investigative Department for Serious Crimes of the Prosecutor General’s Office in connection with the activities of Meydan TV.

In June 2021, an international investigation conducted by the Organized Crime and Corruption Reporting Project (OCCRP) and its partner organizations alleged that the Azerbaijani government had used the Pegasus spyware, developed by the Israeli company NSO Group, to target journalists, politicians, and civil society activists. The leaked list included the names of more than 80 Azerbaijanis, among them Ramin Deco.

== International attention ==
The arrest of Meydan TV journalists has drawn sharp criticism. Influential international organizations have called on the Azerbaijani authorities to release the journalists. Leaders of opposition parties in Azerbaijan — including the Azerbaijani Popular Front Party (APFP), the Musavat Party, the Republican Alternative Party (REAL), and the National Council of Democratic Forces — issued statements condemning the arrests of Meydan TV journalists.

The international human rights organization Amnesty International condemned the arrests. "We condemn the recent arrests and call on the Azerbaijani authorities to immediately release the journalists and media workers. We feared a crackdown following COP29, and now we urge the participating states of the UN conference to respond to the ongoing persecution in Azerbaijan — a country that still holds the COP29 presidency," the organization stated. Amnesty International emphasized that the recent arrests of independent journalists, including staff from Meydan TV, are part of a broader crackdown that began a year ago, aimed at silencing critical and independent voices.

The press freedom organization Reporters Without Borders (RSF) also condemned the arrests of Meydan TV staff. In a message on the RSF account on the X platform, it said: "Reporters Without Borders condemn these new arrests and call for the immediate release of them and 13 other journalists held in disgraceful conditions on fabricated charges."

The New York-based Committee to Protect Journalists (CPJ) likewise denounced the arrests of Meydan TV staff: "Azerbaijani authorities must immediately release Natig Javadli, Khayala Aghayeva, Aytaj Tapdig, Aynur Elgunesh, Aysel Umudova, and Ramin Jabrayilzade — along with more than a dozen other leading journalists detained on similar charges in recent months — and put an end to this unprecedented assault on the independent press," CPJ emphasized.

The international media rights organization Article 19 also condemned the arrests: "Just weeks after the climate summit in Baku, at least seven journalists — most of them from Meydan TV — were detained. These repressions are a stark reminder that Azerbaijan does not tolerate criticism or dissent. We must continue resisting the pressure on press freedom," the organization posted on its X (formerly Twitter) account.

The human rights organization Freedom Now also joined calls to end the pressure on the independent press in Azerbaijan: "Azerbaijan continues to harshly persecute independent journalists. The latest act of repression is the detention of five Meydan TV journalists on clearly politically motivated grounds. We call for their immediate release and an end to this persecution," the organization stated on its X account.

Women Press Freedom (WPF) in its statement supported Meydan TV and all journalists in Azerbaijan who continue risking their safety to report the truth: "Silencing the press is an attack on democracy," the WPF statement said.

The UK Ambassador to Azerbaijan, Fergus Auld, also sharply criticised the arrests: “The detention of Meydan TV journalists at the end of the COP29 climate conference is a slap in the face to democratic governments,” he wrote on his official X account.

=== US State Department response ===
On December 11, 2024, United States Secretary of State Antony Blinken issued a special statement regarding the arrests of activists and journalists in Azerbaijan and called on the country's authorities to release them. Baku accused Blinken of bias and rejected the claims of suppressing civil liberties. In his statement titled "Escalation of Repression Against Civil Society and Media in Azerbaijan," Blinken specifically mentioned Rufat Safarov, Sevinj Vagifgizi, Azer Gasimli, Farid Mehralizade, Bakhtiyar Hajiyev, recently detained Meydan TV staff, and many others arrested for their human rights work. The U.S. called on the Azerbaijani government to release them immediately, Blinken stated. "The United States is deeply concerned not only about these detentions but also about the increasing repression of civil society and media in Azerbaijan," the United States Department of State's statement emphasized. The Azerbaijani Ministry of Foreign Affairs responded negatively to Blinken's statement, accusing the U.S. State Department of interfering in the country's internal affairs. According to the ministry, such interference has continued "for the past four years," which has been "lost years for Azerbaijani-American relations."

== See also ==
- Serial arrests of journalists in Azerbaijan

== External linкs ==
- "Ramin Jabrayilzade (Deкo)". Profile. «Committee to Protect Journalists (CPJ)». 2025-05-11.
- "Ramin Jabrayilzade (Deкo)". Profile. «Free Voices Collective». 2025-05-11.
