= Sabirkənd =

Sabirkənd may refer to:

- Sabirkənd, Nakhchivan, Azerbaijan
- Sabirkənd, Shamkir, Azerbaijan
