= Mamusta =

- Municipality
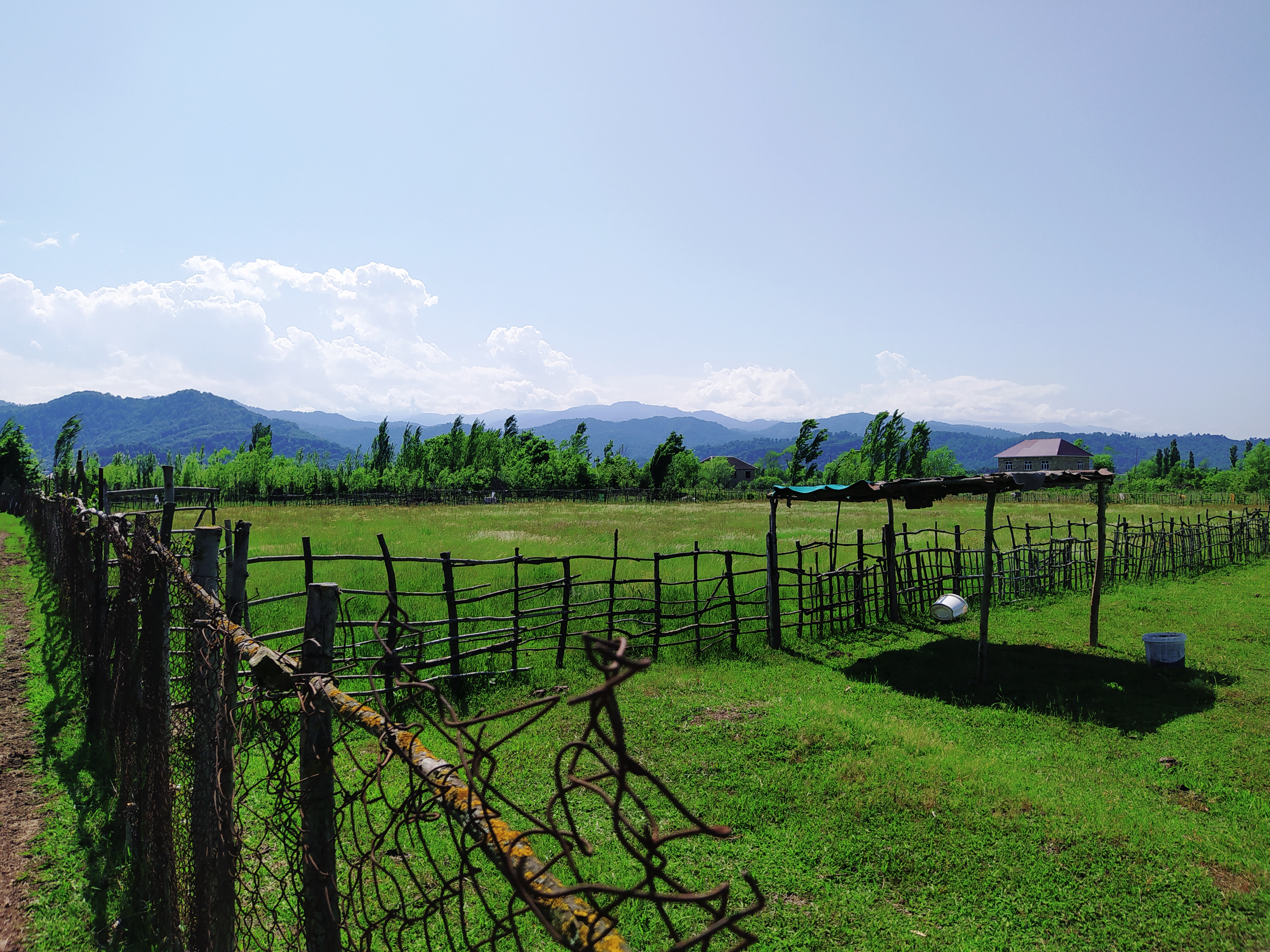

- Location within Azerbaijan
- Coordinates: 38°39′28″N 48°50′53″E
- Country: Azerbaijan
- Rayon: Lankaran

Population
  - Total: 4,402
- Time zone: UTC+4 (AZT)
  - Summer (DST): UTC+5 (AZT)

Mamusta is a village and municipality in the Lankaran Rayon of Azerbaijan. It has a population of 4,402.
