= Sütəmurdov =

- Municipality
- Location within Azerbaijan
- Coordinates: 38°44′34″N 48°51′41″E
- Country: Azerbaijan
- Rayon: Lankaran

Population
  - Total: 3,770
- Time zone: UTC+4 (AZT)
  - Summer (DST): UTC+5 (AZT)

Sütəmurdov (also, Sutamurdo and Sutamurdob) is a village and municipality in the Lankaran Rayon of Azerbaijan. It has a population of 3,770.
