= Zövlə =

- Municipality
- Location within Azerbaijan
- Coordinates: 38°53′22″N 48°43′18″E
- Country: Azerbaijan
- Rayon: Lankaran

Population
  - Total: 2,474
- Time zone: UTC+4 (AZT)
  - Summer (DST): UTC+5 (AZT)

Zövlə (also, Zovlya and Zavilya) is a village and municipality in the Lankaran Rayon of Azerbaijan. It has a population of 2,474.
