= Sinovli =

- Location within Azerbaijan
- Coordinates: 38°50′16″N 48°41′29″E
- Country: Azerbaijan
- Rayon: Lankaran
- Municipality: Osakücə
- Time zone: UTC+4 (AZT)
  - Summer (DST): UTC+5 (AZT)

Sinovli (also, Sunuvly) is a village in the Lankaran Rayon of Azerbaijan. The village forms part of the municipality of Osakücə.
