= Günəhir =

- Municipality
- Location within Azerbaijan
- Coordinates: 38°49′00″N 48°36′23″E
- Country: Azerbaijan
- Rayon: Lankaran

Population
  - Total: 845
- Time zone: UTC+4 (AZT)
  - Summer (DST): UTC+5 (AZT)

Günəhir (also, Gyunagir and Gyunagyar) is a village and municipality in the Lankaran Rayon of Azerbaijan. It has a population of 845.
