= Nüvədi, Lankaran =

Nüvədi, Lankaran may refer to:

- Aşağı Nüvədi, Azerbaijan
- Yuxarı Nüvədi, Azerbaijan
