= Daşdalıqcar =

Azerbaijani village

Coordinates: 38°39′N 48°50′E

Daşdalıqcar is a village and municipality in the Lankaran Rayon of Azerbaijan. It has a population of 1,400.
