= Qumbaşı =

- Location within Azerbaijan
- Coordinates: 38°56′17″N 48°47′03″E
- Country: Azerbaijan
- Rayon: Lankaran
- Municipality: Liman
- Time zone: UTC+4 (AZT)
  - Summer (DST): UTC+5 (AZT)

Qumbaşı (also, Kumbashi) is a village in the Lankaran Rayon of Azerbaijan. The village forms part of the municipality of Liman.
