= Velədi =

Velyadi
- Location within Azerbaijan
- Coordinates: 38°45′N 48°52′E
- Country: Azerbaijan
- Rayon: Lankaran
- Municipality: Gərmətük
- Elevation: −17 m (−56 ft)
- Time zone: UTC+4 (AZT)
  - Summer (DST): UTC+5 (AZT)

Velyadi (also, Velyady) is a village in the Lankaran Rayon of Azerbaijan. The village forms part of the municipality of Gərmətük.
