= Naftoruon =

- Village
- Location within Azerbaijan
- Coordinates: 38.813°N 48.714°E
- Country: Azerbaijan
- Rayon: Lankaran
- Time zone: UTC+4 (AZT)
  - Summer (DST): UTC+5 (AZT)

Naftoruon is a village in the municipality of Osakücə in the Lankaran Rayon of Azerbaijan.
