= Qodəsə =

Coordinates: 38°48′N 48°37′E

Qodəsə is a village in the municipality of Türkəncil in the Lankaran Rayon of Azerbaijan.
