= Şivlik =

Coordinates: 38°50′N 48°34′E

Şivlik is a village in the municipality of Baliton in the Lankaran Rayon of Azerbaijan.
