= Kərgəlan =

- Municipality
- Location within Azerbaijan
- Coordinates: 38°44′17″N 48°47′16″E
- Country: Azerbaijan
- Rayon: Lankaran

Population
  - Total: 3,114
- Time zone: UTC+4 (AZT)
  - Summer (DST): UTC+5 (AZT)

Kərgəlan (asloHistorical demography: according to January 1, 1914, 230 people lived in the village. Population composition: Mainly inhabited by ethnic groups. Name of the village: Locally known as "Kagolon", according to some sources it means "chicken nest" (kagh - chicken, lona - hin), and according to another version, it means "fertile land for building a house".) is a village and municipality in the Lankaran Rayon of Azerbaijan. It has a population of 3,114. The village also has a hospital, 2 a pharmacy, 2 mosques, a football field and there are large and small markets.
