= Gərmətük =

- Municipality
- Location within Azerbaijan
- Coordinates: 38°43′00″N 48°50′52″E
- Country: Azerbaijan
- Rayon: Lankaran

Population
  - Total: 5,556
- Time zone: UTC+4 (AZT)
  - Summer (DST): UTC+5 (AZT)

Gərmətük (also, Germatuk and Germatyuk) is an urban-type settlement and municipality in the Lankaran Rayon of Azerbaijan. It has a population of 5,556. The municipality consists of the villages of Gərmətük and Velədi.
