= Rəzəvül =

- Location within Azerbaijan
- Coordinates: 38°50′N 48°29′E
- Country: Azerbaijan
- Rayon: Lerik
- Municipality: Nüvədi
- Time zone: UTC+4 (AZT)
  - Summer (DST): UTC+5 (AZT)

Rəzəvül (also, Razavuli and Rezavul) is a village in the Lerik Rayon of Azerbaijan. The village forms part of the municipality of Nüvədi.
