= Haftoni =

- Municipality
- Location within Azerbaijan
- Coordinates: 38°45′51″N 48°45′55″E
- Country: Azerbaijan
- Rayon: Lankaran

Population
  - Total: 2,685
- Time zone: UTC+4 (AZT)
  - Summer (DST): UTC+5 (AZT)

Haftoni (also, Gaftoni) is a village and municipality in the Lankaran Rayon of Azerbaijan. It has a population of 2,685. The municipality consists of the villages of Haftoni, Talışlı, and Xanlıqlı.
