= Yuxarı Nüvədi =

- Municipality
- Location within Azerbaijan
- Coordinates: 38°42′57″N 48°48′20″E
- Country: Azerbaijan
- Rayon: Lankaran

Population
  - Total: 2,084
- Time zone: UTC+4 (AZT)
  - Summer (DST): UTC+5 (AZT)

Yuxarı Nüvədi (also, Verkhniye Nyuady, Yukhary Nyuvedi, and Yukhary-Nyugadi) is a village and municipality in the Lankaran Rayon of Azerbaijan. It was recorded at a population of 2,084. The municipality consists of the villages of Yuxarı Nüvədi and Mikolan.
