= Hirkan =

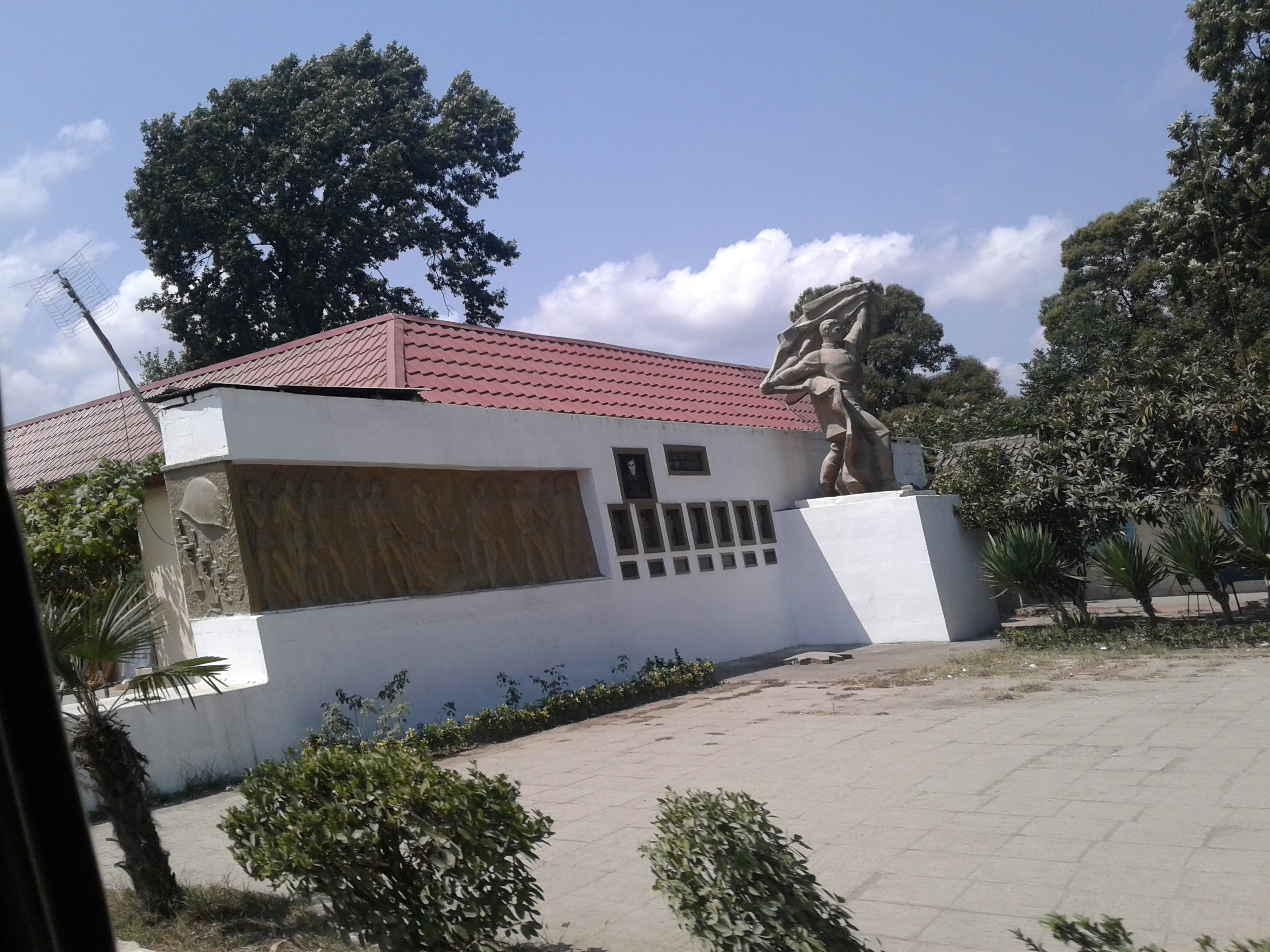

- Location within Azerbaijan
- Coordinates: 38°39′36″N 48°48′24″E
- Country: Azerbaijan
- Rayon: Lankaran
- Time zone: UTC+4 (AZT)
  - Summer (DST): UTC+5 (AZT)

Hirkan (known as Avrora until 1999) is a village and municipality in the Lankaran Rayon of Azerbaijan. It has a population of 1,781.

During the USSR, this was the state farm that produced the mostly tea in Lankaran region. During the USSR, it was called "Avrora Tea State Farm" where most of the tea production throughout Lankaran district had been performed. In 1934, it was named Aurora after the cruiser "Avrora" of the Baltic fleet, and a tea growing state farm “Avrora" was established and thus the foundation of the settlement was laid. It is located in the foothills . In 1964, Hyrkana was granted the status of a city-type settlement.[3] Khanbulanachay reservoir was constructed this settlement. The development of tea growing was accelerated in 1970-1980, in order to meet the need for irrigation of tea plantations, the Khanbulanachay reservoir with a capacity of 52 million m³ (cubic meters) was built on the Basharu river in Lankaran region in 1976, which is still stands out for its robustness. The construction of the dam started in 1967 and was commissioned in 1977. Its water is widely used for irrigation during summer. During the construction of the reservoir, a large forest area remained underwater, where a village was completely submerged. A large lake has formed in the valley, water, fishing has also developed in this lake. When the water level recedes, one can see the houses and their contents remain as they are, except that the houses are filled with mud. There are also old tractors and other machinery that are underwater. There was also a cemetery here, but during the construction of the dam, they removed the bodies from there and buried them elsewhere but the headstones of the graves remained.

== Population and territory ==
According to the information available in 2020, the settlement has a population of 3,126 people. The majority of the population, almost 90%, is Talysh people (iranian speaking people native to the region) . Russians also lived in the settlement, but most of them left the settlement. This was one of the largest tea state farms in Azerbaijan, and now more than 99% of those tea bushes have been replaced by houses or bushes. Currently, tea growing is partially developed in the settlement. The population of the settlement is mainly engaged in citrus plants, agriculture and animal husbandry.
