= Tatoba =

Coordinates: 38°50′N 48°47′E

Tatoba (known as Tatova until 2000) is a village in the municipality of Osakücə in the Lankaran Rayon of Azerbaijan.
