= Liman, Azerbaijan =

Liman
- Municipality
- Location within Azerbaijan
- Coordinates: 38°52′24″N 48°48′50″E
- Country: Azerbaijan
- Rayon: Lankaran

Population
  - Total: 12,100
- Time zone: UTC+4 (AZT)
  - Summer (DST): UTC+5 (AZT)

Liman (from 1924–1999, Port-İliç, Iliich, Iliitch Port, Port-Ilyich, Port-Il’ich, and Port-Il’icha - after Vladimir Ilich Lenin) is a city and municipality in the Lankaran Rayon of Azerbaijan. It has a population of 12,100. The municipality consists of the city of Liman and the nearby villages of Şirinsu and Qumbaşı.
