= Aşağı Nüvədi =

- Municipality
- Location within Azerbaijan
- Coordinates: 38°43′07″N 48°51′38″E
- Country: Azerbaijan
- Rayon: Lankaran

Population (2008)
  - Total: 3,218
- Time zone: UTC+4 (AZT)
  - Summer (DST): UTC+5 (AZT)

Aşağı Nüvədi (also, Ashagi Nuvadi, Ashagy Nyuvedi, and Nizhniye Nyuady) is a village and municipality in the Lankaran Rayon of Azerbaijan. It has a population of 3,218.
