= Separadi, Lankaran =

Separadi
- Municipality
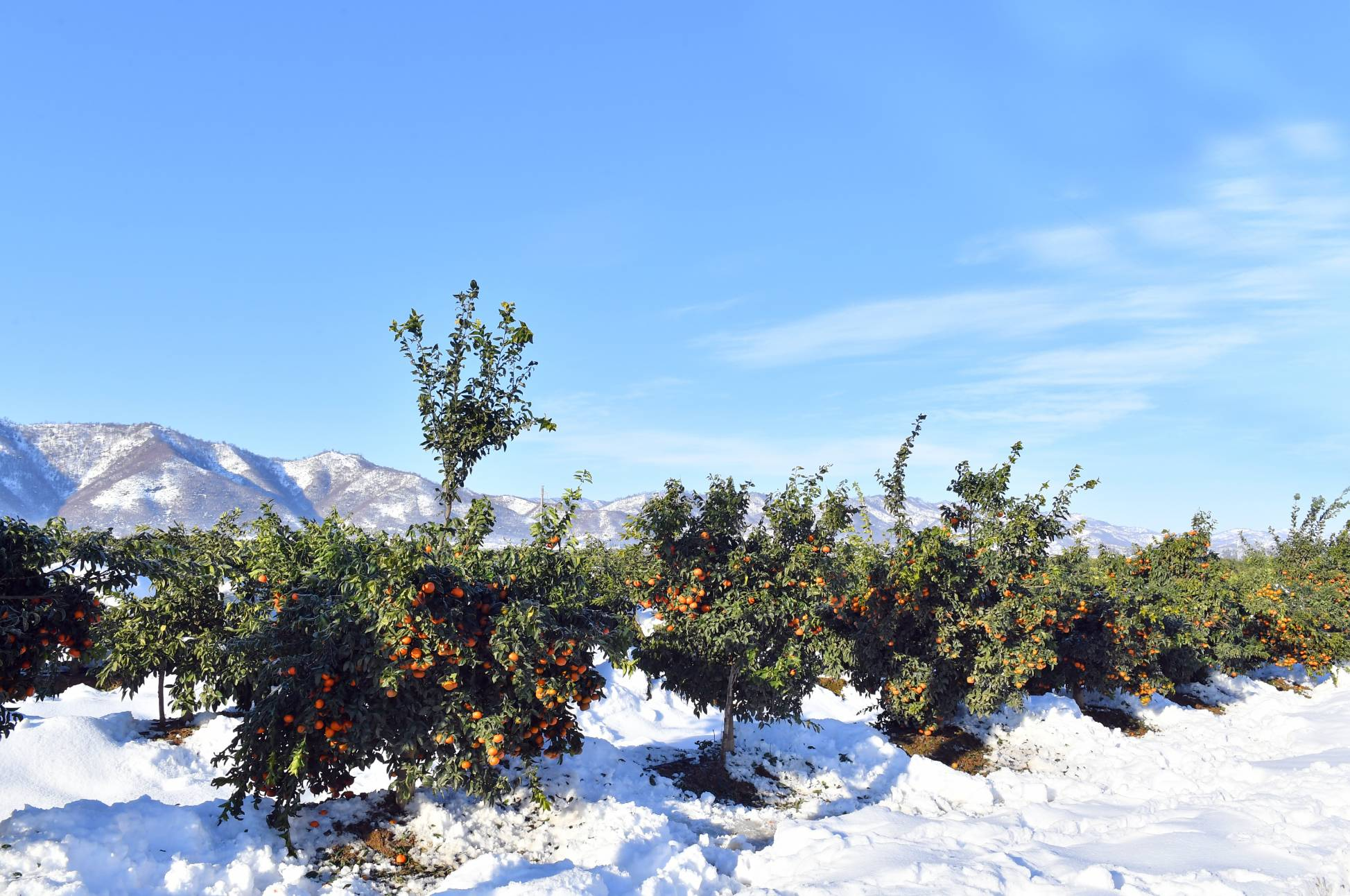
- Citrus orchard of Separadi 2024

- Location within Azerbaijan
- Coordinates: 38°51′49″N 48°42′47″E
- Country: Azerbaijan
- Rayon: Lankaran

Population
  - Total: 3,173
- Time zone: UTC+4 (AZT)
  - Summer (DST): UTC+5 (AZT)

Separadi (also, Siperady) is a village and municipality in the Lankaran Rayon of Azerbaijan. It has a population of 3,173.
