= Nüvədi =

- Municipality
- Location within Azerbaijan
- Coordinates: 38°49′32″N 48°28′01″E
- Country: Azerbaijan
- Rayon: Lerik

Population
  - Total: 384
- Time zone: UTC+4 (AZT)
  - Summer (DST): UTC+5 (AZT)

Nüvədi (also, Nyuady and Nyuvedi) is a village and municipality in the Lerik Rayon of Azerbaijan. It has a population of 384. The municipality consists of the villages of Nüvədi and Rəzəvül.
