= Sabirkənd, Nakhchivan =

Sabirkənd
- Municipality
- Location within Azerbaijan
- Coordinates: 38°56′N 45°50′E
- Country: Azerbaijan
- Autonomous republic: Nakhchivan
- District: Ordubad

Population (2005)
  - Total: 1,028
- Time zone: UTC+4 (AZT)

Sabirkənd (also, Sabirkend, Sabir Kend and Sabir) is a village and municipality in the Ordubad District of Nakhchivan, Azerbaijan. It is located in the right side of the Ordubad-Nakhchivan highway, 23 km in the north-west from the district center, on the right bank of the Aras river. Its population is busy with gardening, vegetable-growing, farming and animal husbandry. There are secondary school, club, library and a medical center in the village. It has a population of 1,028.

== Etymology ==
In some of the literature it has been registered as Sabir Dizə. The village was named after Azerbaijani poet Mirza Alakbar Sabir.

== Historical and archaeological monuments ==
=== Subatan Diza ===
Subatan Diza - the settlement of the end of the Bronze and Early Iron Ages in the south-west of the village of the Sabirkend, on the right bank of the Gilanchay River in the Ordubad region. It was discovered in 1976. Its area is 5 hectares. Cultural layer thickness is 3 m. During the exploration researches from the area of the settlement were found samples of the monochrome colored and simple clay pots, grain stones, stone hammers, obsidian plates etc. The monochrome colored pots which is typical for Iron Age are decorated with red ornaments. According to the findings, the settlement belongs to the 2nd half of the 2nd millennium and the beginning of the 1st millennium BC.

=== Sabirkend Necropolis ===
Sabirkend Necropolis - the archaeological monument of the Bronze Age in the south-west of the same named village of the Ordubad region. It is next to the ancient settlement of Subatan-Diza. As a historical monument it was registered in 1975. Most of the graves of square-type, were destroyed during the farm works in the 1960s. Here were found the monochrome painted potteries, the flat bronze daggers and other artifacts of the material culture. According to the findings, is supposed that the Sabirkend necropolis belongs to the 16-14 century BC.
