= Lankaran District =

District in southeastern Azerbaijan

Coordinates: 38.7500°N 48.8500°E

Lankaran District Lənkəran rayonu
- District
- Map of Azerbaijan showing Lankaran District
- Country: Azerbaijan
- Region: Lankaran-Astara
- Established: 8 August 1930
- Capital: Lankaran
- Settlements: 93

Government
  - Governor: Taleh Garashov

Area
  - Total: 1,540 km^{2} (590 sq mi)

Population (2020)
  - Total: 232,000
  - Density: 151/km^{2} (390/sq mi)
- Time zone: UTC+4 (AZT)
- Postal code: 4200
- Website: lenkeran-ih.gov.az

Lankaran District (Azerbaijani: Lənkəran rayonu) is one of the 66 districts of Azerbaijan. It is located in the southeast of the country, in the Lankaran-Astara Economic Region. The district borders the districts of Astara, Lerik, Masally, and Neftchala. Its capital and largest city is Lankaran, although the city is technically not part of the district and is subordinate to the Republic. As of 2020, the district had a population of 232,000.

== History ==
Archaeological excavations indicate that people have lived in the region since at least the Bronze Age (3rd or 2nd millennia BC). The area around Lankaran has fertile soil, rich water reserves and a humid subtropical climate with a maximum annual precipitation of 1,600 to 1,800 mm, the highest in Azerbaijan, leading to abundant agriculture, cattle-breeding, gardening, fishing, bee-keeping and silk production. Blacksmith, copper-smith, pottery and other trades have long been well established too. The area's development was also aided by its location as a point of communication between ancient empires, leading to caravan trade funnelled along the Caspian Sea coast.

Between 1747 and 1813, Lankaran was the main city of the Talysh Khanate. Following the 1813 Gulistan Treaty, the northern area of the khanate was occupied by Russia, and the remainder was seized in the final Russo-Persian war of 1826–1828. The 1828 Treaty of Turkmenchay left the area within the Russian empire and the khanate was abolished. During the 19th century, Lankaran exported rice, silk, vegetables, wood and fish to Russia. During the 20th century, the tea-cultivation and processing industry became important in the district.

The area was briefly the centre of a Bolshevik-inspired Mughan Soviet Republic during 1919. A similar separatist autonomous region was briefly created in 1993 again, with the capital being Lankaran. During the period of instability that followed Azerbaijan's 1991 independence from the USSR, Lankaran and surrounding districts were briefly declared the Talysh-Mughan Autonomous Republic, but this only survived between June and August 1993. Today the region is an integral part of the Azerbaijan Republic.

Lankaran was established as an administrative district on August 8, 1930. The district's tea industry struggled post-independence due to increased competition from exports and the results of land redistribution: the break-up of Soviet-era collective farms into small personal plots having rendered most tea-cultivation unprofitable. The district also suffered severely from the rising level of the Caspian Sea, most notably at Narimanabad where many waterfront properties were washed away.

== Geography ==
The region has a vast area of national parks, where a variety of fauna and flora are preserved. Gizil-Agach State Reserve hosts over 250 kinds of plants, 30 species of fish and more than 220 kinds of birds. Lankaran is also known for Parrotia persica, or ironwood. It is naturally grown in the region and could be seen in Hirkan National Park. Local myth has it that it is the only wood that sinks in water, hence the name (ironwood). Historically it has been used for heating since it burns for a long time and is not easily extinguished. The Persian leopard (Panthera pardus saxicolous), a subspecies of the leopard, lives in the national park as well.

== Climate ==
Climate data for Lankaran
Month	Jan	Feb	Mar	Apr	May	Jun	Jul	Aug	Sep	Oct	Nov	Dec	Year
Mean daily maximum °C (°F)	6.2 (43.2)	6.7 (44.1)	9.6 (49.3)	15.2 (59.4)	21.3 (70.3)	26.3 (79.3)	29.0 (84.2)	28.4 (83.1)	23.7 (74.7)	18.6 (65.5)	13.7 (56.7)	8.5 (47.3)	17.3 (63.1)
Mean daily minimum °C (°F)	1.0 (33.8)	1.5 (34.7)	4.1 (39.4)	9.4 (48.9)	14.2 (57.6)	18.1 (64.6)	20.8 (69.4)	20.5 (68.9)	17.8 (64.0)	12.8 (55.0)	7.4 (45.3)	3.4 (38.1)	10.9 (51.6)
Average precipitation mm (inches)	79 (3.1)	86 (3.4)	102 (4.0)	55 (2.2)	39 (1.5)	28 (1.1)	19 (0.7)	54 (2.1)	147 (5.8)	189 (7.4)	134 (5.3)	87 (3.4)	1,019 (40)
Source: Climate-Data.org

== Water and sewerage ==
Some measures have been undertaken to improve the drinking water supply of the city and to reconstruct the city's sewage system. The reconstruction of the Lankaran water supply and sewerage system began in August 2011. A water purification system, one water reservoir with a capacity of 10000 m3, 252 km of water lines with different diameter, 12,000 Smartcard water meters, 21 km of sewer line have been installed and 12 km of micro tunnel layout are planned in Khanbulan village of Lankaran by the company.

== Power supply ==
Ten Smartcard electricity meters, 154 electronic single-phase electricity meters were installed and 191 defective meters were changed during 3 months of 2017 in the Lankaran district. Totally 16892 Smart card electricity meters have been installed in the district. Currently[data missing], government carry out work of energy sales and exploitation to settlements and villages of the district including 47,914 individual subscribers, 46 refugees, 3052 trade and services, 891 productions, transport and construction, 155 budgets and 157 other consumer groups.

== Gas supply ==
During the three months of 2017, some measures have been undertaken for providing residential areas and companies with gas supply in the city. Thus, 43,565 people were provided with natural gas, 252 km of water lines with different diameter were set up, 426 gas problem detected and eliminated 153 gas meters were replaced, 291 defective meters were changed with new ones. There are 65 settlements including Lankaran and Liman city that have been provided with gas, which means 90.1% of the total people of the district.

== Districts ==
- Kargalan, Azerbaijan
- Separadi
- Liman (city)
- Narimanabad
- Garmatuk
- Ashagi Nuvadi
- Hirkan
- Haftoni
- Isti Su
- Balighcilar

== Population ==
- Total population: 232.000
- Percentage urban population: 39%
- Percentage rural population: 61%

The vast majority of the district's population is talysh, the rest are azerbaijanis and other nationalities. At the beginning of the nineteenth century, there were 422 Muslim homes in the city. After the Gulustan contract in 1813, the number of population of Lankaran decreased. This is related to the colonial policy of Tsardom of Russia. After the occupation of the Talysh Khanate, Armenians began to come for living here. In 1832 there were 168 Armenians living in Lankaran. In the year 1849, there were 1999 residents including 125 Bey(King), 20 Mirza, 46 Sayyids, 56 Mullahs, 92 temporary residents, 699 maafs, 168 ethnics, 66 Armenians and 114 Russians in 1849. According to official information on January 1, 2012, the population of Lankaran is 52,581 people.

According to the State Statistics Committee, as of 2018, the population of the city recorded 226,900 persons, which increased by 35,600 persons (about 18.6 percent) from 191,300 persons in 2000. Of the total population, 113,900 are men and 113,000 are women. More than 25,4 percent of the population (about 55,700 persons) consists of young people and teenagers aged 14–29.

The population of the district by the year (at the beginning of the year, thousand persons)
Region	2000	2001	2002	2003	2004	2005	2006	2007	2008	2009	2010	2011	2012	2013	2014	2015	2016	2017	2018	2019	2020	2021
Lankaran town	191,3	192,5	193,6	194,8	196,0	197,8	199,6	201,4	203,1	205,2	207,5	209,9	213,2	215,8	218,2	220,8	223,1	225,2	226,9	228,7	230,2	231,1
urban population	77,5	77,6	77,7	77,9	80,2	80,6	80,8	81,1	82,3	82,7	83,3	83,9	84,7	85,3	85,8	86,5	87,2	87,8	88,2	88,6	89,1	89,3
rural population	113,8	114,9	115,9	116,9	115,8	117,2	118,8	120,3	120,8	122,5	124,2	126,0	128,5	130,5	132,4	134,3	135,9	137,4	138,7	140,1	141,1	141,8

Lankaran district is the largest Talysh region in terms of population. The total population is 230,300 people, The majority of the district's population is talysh. It includes the cities of Lankaran and Liman, as well as six other cities and eighty-five villages. These are large centers of trade and culture among the talysh.

== Education ==
There are 51 kindergartens, 81 educational institutions, pedagogical, medical and musical schools in Lankaran. 87 clubs, 94 libraries, State Drama Theater, museum, branch of Azerbaijan Scientific Research Institute of Fisheries and Subtropical Crops operate.

Since 1992 Lankaran State University, Azerbaijan National EA Regional Science Center since 2006 have been established. Lankaran branch of Azerbaijan Research Institute of Horticulture and Subtropical Crops of ANAS, Zona Experimental Station, Lankaran branch of the Institute of Improvement of Teachers, Lankaran Humanitarian College, Medical School, Children's Art School operate in Lankaran.

== Press and mass media ==
"Lankaran" newspaper belonging to Lankaran City Executive Authority has been operating since 1991. Independent newspapers such as "Prizma" (2004), "Şəfəq" (1992), literary magazines such as "Söz" (1994), "Məşəl" (1999), radio broadcasting editing since 1957, Lankaran television has been operating since 2004.

== Culture ==
cultural and educational institutions in Lankaran operate under the direction of the Lankaran Regional Culture and Tourism Department. Located in the district is the Heydar Aliyev Center, two museums (History Museum, H.Aslanov's house museum), one central library and its 70 branches, City Cultural Center named after Q.Valiyev and 66 cultural institutions, two children's music schools, a children's art school, a State Painting Gallery. Based on the No.132 Decree of the Cabinet of Ministers of the Republic of Azerbaijan, 21 mainly archaeological monuments, 53 local architectural monuments, and two sculpture monuments that are registered and protected by the government.

=== The Lankaran History and Ethnography Museum ===
The Lankaran History and Ethnography Museum consist of 3 floors and 12 rooms. The museum is located in the house of Mir Ahmed Khan, now a historical monument built in 1913. Since 1978, the Khan House has been operating as a Lankaran History and Ethnography Museum. There are more than 6500 exhibits reflecting Lankaran's ancient history, culture, national-moral values and today in the museum. The exposition of the museum consists of six sections: nature, ancient history, medieval history, new era, recent period (1917–1945), modern era (from 1945 to present).

=== Hazi Aslanov House Museum ===
The house-museum of the Hero of the Soviet Union, a prominent military commander and the major general Hazi Aslanov, was opened on May 9, 1969(on Victory Day of Azerbaijan). The first director of the museum was Khaver Aslanova who is H.Aslanov's wife. In 1983 the exposition of the museum was expanded and reconstructed. The exposition consists of five rooms. In 2011, the museum was completely renovated. The museum consists of five sections and rooms. The first room is the ethnographic room reflects the environment where he was born and dying. The things in this room belong to the mother of H.Aslanov. His sister Asiya Aslanova gave them to the museum. The second room is dedicated to years of education and military service. The third room is dedicated to the fights for Moscow and Stalingrad (1941–1943). The fourth room is dedicated to the fight for the Primorye and Belarus (1944–1945). The last room is a commemorative hall, Different presents to the house, the battle clothes on the day of his death, souvenirs, his albums and books are protected in this room.

== Notable natives ==
- Samad bey Mehmandarov
- Hazi Aslanov
- Allahshukur Pashazadeh, Sheikh ul-Islam and Grand Mufti of the Caucasus

== See also ==
- Lankaran Lowland
