= Archaeology of Azerbaijan =

Archeological sites in Azerbaijan first gained public interest in the mid-19th century and were reported by European travellers.

The Institute of Archaeology and Anthropology of the Azerbaijan National Academy of Sciences now conducts researches into archaeology, ethnography, numismatics, epigraphy, anthropology, ethnosociology and ethnopolitology in Azerbaijan. Since 1999 the Department of History and Archaeology of Khazar University publishes the Journal of Azerbaijan Archaeology.

In 1920, the Museum of History of Azerbaijan was established, exhibiting archaeological finds from different parts of Azerbaijan. The Ancient and Medieval History sections of the museum have a total of over 25,000 items. Since 1969, museum archaeologists have been conducting underwater archaeological excavations beneath the Caspian Sea.

== Paleolithic era ==
The Lower Paleolithic, the first stage of the Paleolithic era, covers the period from 3.2 million years ago to 100,000 years ago. The main belongings to prehistoric humans for this period were found in the Azykh cave in the Guruchay valley near Fuzuli region. It is hard to distinguish the instruments found here from river stones. Bashing, cracking, knapping, pecking, grinding or polishing stones of various kinds to manufacture tools were found in this period. As well as the bones of various wild animals were found here. Azikh cave is in the fourth place in the world by its age (but it was the first in the former USSR). The remains of the jawbone of human lived 350-450 thousand years ago, which were found in 1962 by Azerbaijani historian Mammadali Huseynov proved it.

The Middle Paleolithic period of Azerbaijan was studied on the basis of Taghlar in Karabakh, Damcıli and Dashsalahli caves in Gazakh region. The Taghlar cave was explored by archaeologist Mammadali Huseynov in 1960.

There is a two large cave in the Avey mountain of the Gazakh region. The cave on the south-western side of the mountain is called Dassalahli, and on the south-east side is called Damcılı. In 1957-1958, scientists studied these caves and found labor tools of humans who lived here. Examples found in the Tamtama cave, 20 km north of Lake Urmia, show that humans living here had hunting ability.

Archaeological research shows that about 40-35 thousand years ago, the Mustye culture in Azerbaijan was replaced by Upper Paleolithic culture.

== Mesolithic period ==
Nearly 12 thousand years ago, the Upper Palaeolithic period was replaced by the Mesolithic period in the territory of Azerbaijan. Melting of glaciers and warming of the weather in this period resulted in climate change, some changes in humans’ life and economy. The Mesolithic period in Azerbaijan was mainly studied on the basis of Gobustan monuments. Large limestone fragments were found on the slopes of Boyukdash, Kichikdash and Cingirdash mountains, located 60 km away from Baku. A number of drawings were detected on these limestone pieces and on the walls of the caves. During the archaeological digs in Boyukdash Mountain, it was determined that the drawings here were covered by the material and cultural remains of the Neolithic and Mesolithic era. Studies show that prehistoric humans living in Gobustan had ideological imaginations about totem and enchantment. The lifestyle and occupation of humans were clearly reflected in these illustrations. During the archaeological investigations, in Firuz camp that had been used as seasonal dwellings in that period 12 buried human skeletons have been found.

== Neolithic period ==
Archaeological research shows that during the 7th-6th millennium B.C the Mesolithic period was replaced by the Neolithic period. At present, researchers divide the Neolithic period into two stages: The Pottery Neolithic Period and Pre-Pottery Neolithic period. Material and cultural examples of the Neolithic period were found in Damcılı cave, Gobustan monuments (Ovçular mağarası (Hunters' cave), Anazagha, Firuz, Buyukdag mountains ), Nakhchivan Kultepe, Khanlar, Garakopektepe, Yanigtepe, Haji Firuz, Shomutepe, Toyretepe and other monuments. The study of the monuments shows that during this period humans settled in open camps and were living sedentary lifestyle. Some Instruments found in Gobustan such as fork-like, resembling the harvesting sickles show that farming had been developed. Pre-historic human prepared these tools from mainly river stones. One of the most important innovations belonging to the Neolithic era is the formation of pottery and weaving.

== Chalcolithic period ==
The Eneolithic period in this region is dated 6th-4th millennium B.C. The basis of smelting and working copper was laid in Azerbaijan during this period.

One site that aided in understanding of the Chalcolithic period and civilization at the time is Yatag Tepesi (also referred to as Yataq-Tepesi), which was inhabited during the middle and late Chalcolithic period in Iran close to Azerbaijan. This area was inhabited by the same people as other places in Azerbaijan. Evidence for an agricultural based life include, presence of ceramic animal shaped figurines, hooves that are of different sizes, along with stone tools like a grindstone and mortar. This location has distinctive pottery linked to the middle and late Chalcolithic period, consisting mostly of smoothed outside and open topped pottery. The poetry has exterior and interior colors consisting of beige, gray, dark and light brown, with one artifact having a brick color. The open top style of the poetry is also a sign that the inhabitants relied on agriculture. This is because the open topped style of pottery has a tendency to store non-perishables or long lasting goods.

== Guruchay culture ==
Guruchay culture is an archaeological culture in the territory of Azerbaijan. Prehistoric humans collected stones from Guruchay valley and brought them to the cave for preparing the tools. At the same time, Azokh humans were engaged with hunting in the Guruchay valley. The Guruchay valley had all the conditions for the living of prehistoric humans. Therefore, remains of the new archaeological culture discovered in the 7-10th layers of the Azykh Cave were named as a Guruchay culture. During the complex archaeological digs, several developed stages of the Guruchay culture have been identified. The preparation of tools was simple in the early stages of culture, but it was improved in later stages. Labor tools of Guruchay culture are closely related to labor tools of the Olduvai Gorge of Africa. However, there are differences in the typology of labor tools. During the investigations, the period of Guruchay culture began about 1.2 million years ago and continued until 700,000 years ago in Azerbaijan.

To study of Paleolithic monuments of Azerbaijan began in the 1950s. The Paleolithic camp was discovered in Damcılı cave located in Dashsalahli village of Gazakh region by S. N. Zamyatin and Mammadali Huseynov during archaeological investigations in 1953. In 1968, fossilized fragments of lower jawbone were found in the Acheulian layer, Guruchay culture which had some common features with the Olduvai Gorge was found in 1974.

Labor tools found on the eighth layer of the Azykh cave are similar to tools found in below layers according to their typological features. However, heavy tools such as choppers and chopping tools are characteristic for this layer.

The seventh layer of Cave reflects the complementary stage of the Guruchay culture. This layer is similar to below layers as typological features but completely different with early Acheulean culture. Stone products on this layer consist of choppers and chopping tools, cubic items, industrial wastes, river stones, and others.

It is not impossible to determine bones belonging to which animals found in the X-VII layers of the Azykh cave, because most of the patterns of fauna were damaged. The detected animal bones belonged to deer, antelope, bird, rodent and carnivora animals. Vulpes aff volpes, Crocuta spelaea, Spelearstos spelaeus, Ursus, Cervus Mesopotamia, Equus sussen bornansis, Equus hydruntinus, Dicerorhinus mercki, Bison schotensaci and other animals lived in the Absheron era of Guruchay culture.

Some rough stone tools prepared from gravel in the Azykh Cave were similar with findings in Olduvai (Tanzania), Koobi-Fora (Kenya), Melka Kontura (Ethiopia), Vallona (France), Ubeydiye (Israel) and other monuments.

The main occupation of the prehistoric humans of the Azykh Cave was hunting and gathering.

== Prehistoric findings ==
Early traces of humans on the territory of Azerbaijan have been found in Azykh Cave (c. 2 million years ago), together with the remains of a fireplace in the same cave dating to 700,000 years BC. The deposits of Azykh Cave span a vast period of the Paleolithic Age from Early Acheulian to Mousterian. The Taglar Cave is considered the richest example of the Mousterian culture in Caucasus and the Near East. The findings in Gobustan and the Damjili Cave represent Early and Late Mesolithic evidence. In the Early Bronze Age the territory of Azerbaijan was the site of Kura–Araxes culture. The artifacts from Late Bronze and Early Iron Ages are represented particularly by over 230 burials in the vicinity of Lankaran.

As a result of surveys and excavations, that began in Mingachevir in 1935, rich archeological evidence from the end of Eneolithic Period to the Late Middle Ages was revealed and more than 20,000 objects have been found. In 2006 a French–Azerbaijani team discovered nine kurgans at the cemetery of Soyuqbulaq. It was dated to the beginning of the 4th millennium BC, which makes it the oldest kurgan cemetery in Transcaucasia. There is also an evidence that the Duzdağı salt deposits in the Araxes valley were already being exploited from the second half of the 5th millennium BC, which is the most ancient exploitation of rock salt attested as of 2010.

The Gobustan National Park, which features prehistoric petroglyphs, is one of the UNESCO World Heritage Sites.

In 2008, the archaeologists from the Institute of Archaeology and Anthropology of Azerbaijan headed by Farhad Guliyev, and the Japanese archaeologists from the University of Tokyo led by Yoshihiro Nishiaki explored the Neolithic site Goytepe archaeological complex. Since 2008, eight radiocarbon analyses (in French and Japanese labs) of coal residues taken from different squares of the excavation area have been carried out. Four of these analyses belonged to the top layers of the site. 2 group of ages were provided, each belonged to different squares, 5450-5350 cal. BC to squares 1A/B, 2A/B, and 5600-5500 cal. BC to 4BII. The other four analyses cover mainly the cultural layer at the 150–175 cm depth. Ceramic, basalt and obsidian, bone-based labour instruments (awls, needles, axes and hammers), pottery specimens, plant and animal remnants were found from the Neolithic cultural sequence. Archaeologists revealed clay bins and ovens/hearths mainly in the courtyard of the settlement close to the wing walls or circular constructions in the archaeological site. The bins with a diameter of 50–60 cm had a round or oval form with a height of 50 cm. The bottom of the bins was dug nearly 10–15 cm into the ground. During the excavations some of them discovered empty, while others were found with different tools and materials showing that they also had a storage function. The ovens with a diameter around 60–70 cm had also a round or oval shape, nevertheless, their bottoms were covered with river cobbles and enclosed by a clay rim.

In 2012-2013, the French-Azerbaijani joint archaeological expedition (named Nabialla) explored the necropolis and burial traditions belong to the Bronze-Iron Age in Lenkaran and Lerik provinces. 10 megalithic structures with a burial mound containing glass, red jasper, carnelian were discovered. A small tripod bowl, around 35 pottery sherds made of orange baked clay were also among the findings.

In 2018, archaeologist Walter Crist from the American Museum of Natural History announced the discovery of a Bronze Age board game (4000 year - old) named “Hounds and Jackals” or “58 holes” in Gobustan National Park. The game was popular in Egypt, Mesopotamia and Anatolia at that time and was identified in the tomb of the ancient Egyptian pharaoh Amenemhat IV.

In 2021, more than 200 stone box graves dating to the Khojali-Gadabay culture of the Late Bronze–Early Iron Age in Azerbaijan were uncovered during the rescue excavations in Çovdar, Dashkasan by archaeologists from the Institute of Archaeology and Anthropology of ANAS. Archaeologists identified a burial custom in which males were buried on their right side and females on their left. Some individuals showed signs of physical illnesses, including dental pathologies, and a trepanned skull was also discovered. Weapons, head ornaments, ceramic products, and a horse burial were among the notable finds.

In July 2024, discovery of the 3.500 year-old dining room with lots of ceramic remains was announced in Tava Tepe in Agstafa by the archaeologists from the University of Catania and the National Academy of Sciences of Azerbaijan. The structure features an entrance supported by wooden columns and topped with a thatched roof, which probably extended over the entire complex. The circular structure, marked by numerous holes, indicates a diameter of around 15 meters. According to the archaeologists, evidence of burning, along with the remains of bowls and glasses made from black burnished ceramics found throughout the excavation area, suggests that the archaeological site was used for food preparation and consumption.

In March 2025, an approximately 8,400-year-old Mesolithic human figurine was discovered in Damjili Cave, western Azerbaijan's Qazax District, by a collaborative Azerbaijani-Japanese team. This small stone artifact, dating to between 6400 and 6100 BC, was carved from river stone. Measuring 51 mm in length and 15 mm in width, the figurine lacks gender-specific features, which contrasts with the predominantly female clay figurines characteristic of the later Neolithic period. Researchers associate the figurine with the early Shomutepe culture.

In July 2025, archaeologists from the Institute of Archaeology and Anthropology of ANAS led by Dr. Shamil Najafov discovered a 3,800-year-old kurgan dating to the Middle Bronze Age in the Ceyranchol plain near the village of Yovshanlidere. The burial mound, measuring 28 meters across and 2 meters high, was divided into three symbolic sections: one with the warrior’s remains and weapons, another containing ceramic vessels, and a third left empty—possibly intended as a spiritual resting space for the soul. The warrior, believed to have been over two meters tall, was buried in a semi-flexed position holding a four-pronged bronze spearhead. Grave goods included bronze ankle rings, obsidian tools, paste beads, and a dozen decorated ceramic jugs filled with cooked animal bones, including goat, cow, horse, and boar. Atop the mound, archaeologists found 14 limestone slabs, each weighing around one ton, along with a carved bull-shaped idol placed at the kurgan’s head.

In July 2025, archaeologists from the Institute of Archaeology and Anthropology of ANAS uncovered the foundations of a Bronze Age settlement in the village of Kechelekeran, Yardimli District. The site revealed ancient dwellings built from river stones, alongside fragments of domestic pottery of various shapes and sizes, miniature household items, and bone spindle whorls.

In February 2026, the Institute of Archaeology and Anthropology of the Azerbaijan Academy of Sciences reported on a multi-year systematic research program at the Khojaly Archaeological Complex. The investigations focused on a vast Muslim necropolis covering more than two hectares, where 212 medieval graves have been excavated out of an estimated total of over 2,000. These burials, alongside the architectural remains of several mausoleums including one dated to 1356–1357 confirm a continuous Muslim-Turkic presence in the region from the 13th to the 18th centuries. The complex also exhibits significant stratigraphic diversity, featuring Bronze Age kurgans (burial mounds) that indicate the site served as a ceremonial and funerary center since prehistoric times. Researchers noted that the material culture and burial typologies align with broader medieval Islamic patterns in the South Caucasus.

== Classical antiquity ==
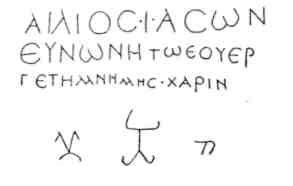
Reproduction of a 2nd-century AD Greek inscription found in 1902 near Böyük Dəhnə

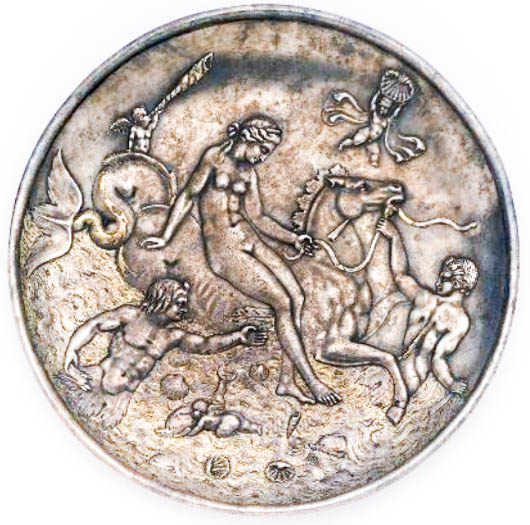
Roman silver plate (2nd–4th century AD), found in Yenikend

The excavations on a cemetery at Yaloylu Tepe revealed important archaeological evidence from the 3rd to 1st centuries BC. The site gave its name to a culture found in the lower parts, steppes and foothills of the Greater Caucasus. In 1926 D. Sharifov discovered previously unknown pottery forms at Yaloylu Tepe.

Notable findings related to Ancient Rome include the rock inscription in Latin at Boyukdash mountain (carved between 81 and 96 AD), which is the easternmost known Roman evidence. It was discovered in 1948 by Ishag Jafarzadeh and mentions Domitian and Legio XII Fulminata. Another Roman inscription, which also mentions that legion, was reportedly seen in 1934 by the paleobotanist Petrov near the town of Füzuli.

In 1894 a Roman silver plate with a Nereid riding a hippocamp and surrounded by tritons, was unearthed in the Yenikend village of Goychay Rayon. Kamilla Trever characterized the plate as "one of the most interesting examples of Roman toreutics".

In 1897, a bronze lamp in the shape of theatrical mask (presumably from the eastern provinces of Roman Empire or from the Hellenistic countries of Near East), dated to 1st–2nd century AD, was found in the village of Zerti.

In 1902, researcher Emil Rösler excavated the remains of an ancient bath near the village of Boyuk Dehne that contained a 2nd-century AD Greek inscription carved on a piece of limestone.

In the 1960s, the content of the Qabala treasures revealed the coins of Emperors Otho, Vespasian, Trajan and Hadrian, as well as drachmas of Alexander the Great and tetradrachms of the Greco-Bactrian Kingdom. There were also coins of Antiochus IV, Antiochus VI and Eucratides.

In 2005, joint Azerbaijani–Korean researches began on the site of ancient Qabala, where archaeological studies had been suspended since 1990.

== Acheulean culture ==
In the Azykh Cave, also known as Azoka Cave in some translations, the period of the Guruchay culture was replaced by ancient Acheulean after its long-term development. The ancient Acheulean culture was detected during the archaeological excavations in the VI section of the Azykh cave. More than 2,000 stone products and many hunted animal bones were found here.

Some artifacts used by the Acheulean culture are handaxes, bifaces, knives, and other tools. Handaxes were found at Gadir-dere and Gayaly predominantly made from basalt and volcanic tuff. The axes from this location are mostly minimally processed and not extensively refined.Another location, Unit V of Azoka Cave, was found to have lithic artifacts consisting of bifaces, choppers, and chopping implements during excavation. This unit of Azoka Cave also has a lack of unaltered or knapped material. This points towards a site elsewhere that handled the manufacture of the tools. This specific layer of the cave is a transitional period between late Acheulean to early pre-Mousterian.

== Mousterian culture ==
The remains of the Mousterian culture during the archeological researches in Azerbaijan were discovered in Azykh (III layer), Taghlar, Dashsalahli, Gazma and Buzeyir camps.

== Kura–Araxes culture ==
The culture of the late Eneolithic and Early Bronze Age (end of 4th millennium BC - 3rd millennium BC). This culture, which firstly appeared in the territory of Azerbaijan, covered the area from the North Caucasus to Mesopotamia, from East Anatolia to Central Asia.

This Period was different from the earlier periods in the pottery it produced. The pottery and ceramic were hand-made and identified as black-burnished with higher levels of smoothness compared to the earlier styles like the Chalcolithic. This pottery has led to us better understanding the social and agricultural way of life they had. The pottery's high level of variation based on regionality has pointed to the Kura–Araxes culture having a slow expansion outward as opposed to large migrations. The pottery also shows that there were levels of variation based on locality.The presence of ceramic with red interiors and black exteriors supports an earlier claim by Raphael Greenberg in 2007 that the pottery could have meanings attributed to the ceramic color. Many of the ceramics had lids with them pointing towards a shift in dietary practices based in boiling, steaming, and similar actions. This supports the importance of ceramics in food and agriculture.

The Kura–Araxes culture has a connection with funerary practices that can aid in explaining the social structure they had along with their relationship between life and death. There is a large level of variation in funerary practices with some common methods used being stone tombs (or cists), pit graves, Catacombs and Kugans. These funerary locations contain grave goods but not in large amounts. Some of these burial practices and methods like Kugans were dated back to as far as the fifth millennium during the Chalcolithic period. One site that can assist in understanding the implications of the burials is Kurgan 8 at Uzun Rama. Kurgans are large earthen mounds used in burials. The Kurgan shows burials that emphasize horizontal kinship. The size of the Kurgans and their burial items lead to the possibility the sites were being used as return locations showing a close connection between the deceased and the living. The Uzun Rama site shows that this culture had social values not based on strict hierarchies.

== Medieval findings ==
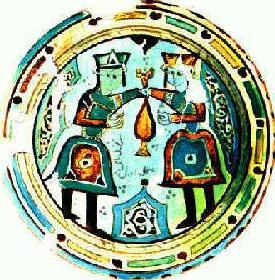
Faience plate from Beylagan, 12th century

During several excavations in the Inner City of Baku various medieval artifacts have been unearthed, including ceramic items and two tandoors. One of the tandoors was in the 12th-century layer.

Large-scale excavations on the left bank of Shamkirchay, that started in 2007, revealed the remnants of monumental public building, dated to 9th–10th century. Studies of medieval Azerbaijani fortresses like Chirag Gala, Shindan, Gazankeshki, Ballabur and Gilgilchay defence system have been also conducted.

== See also ==
- Persian propyleion, Karacamirli
- Bioarchaeology in Azerbaijan
- Archaeological site of Kharabagilan
- Archaeological site of Qarachinar

== See also ==
- History of Azerbaijan
