= Bioarchaeology in Azerbaijan =

Bioarchaeology in Azerbaijan, also referred to as physical anthropology in the archaeological context, is the scientific study of human biological and cultural evolution, skeletal remains, and ancient health patterns within the territory of Azerbaijan. The field combines approaches from Soviet-era physical anthropology with modern bioarchaeological techniques, including ancient DNA (aDNA) and paleopathological analysis. Research in this field is primarily conducted at the Institute of Archaeology and Anthropology of the Azerbaijan National Academy of Sciences (ANAS).

== History of Research ==
Anthropological investigations in Azerbaijan began during the early 20th century. Research expanded following the 1960 discovery of Azykh Cave by Mammadali Huseynov. A Neanderthal-like jaw bone found in 1968 is assumed to be around 250,000 years old and is considered one of the oldest hominin remains found in the Caucasus. Its discovery gave rise to the term Azykh Man. Archaeologists have suggested that the finds from the lowest layers belong to a pre-Acheulean culture (730,000 to 1,800,000 years ago), that resembles the Olduwan culture named after Tanzania's Olduvai Gorge in many respects.

Recent studies of skeletal remains from the Eminli necropolis (1st century AD) have identified traits associated with the “Caspian type,” described in anthropological literature as a local variant of the Mediterranean morphological group characterized by dolichocephaly (long-headedness).

== Physical Anthropology Laboratory ==
Following structural reforms at the Institute of Archaeology and Anthropology in May 2024, a specialized laboratory for physical anthropology was established. The facility is tasked with the standardized processing and analysis of human remains recovered from archaeological sites across Azerbaijan.

The laboratory's primary research objectives include:

- Biological Profiling: Researching the biological characteristics of both ancient and modern populations to detect diversity and determine the degree of genetic and physical closeness between Azerbaijanis and other Eurasian populations.
- Paleopathology: The reconstruction of the health status, dietary habits, and lifestyles of ancient populations based on pathological markers recorded in skeletal and dental remains.
- Ancient DNA (aDNA) Preparation: The facility ensures the implementation of preliminary biological procedures for obtaining bone samples for DNA analysis and conducting macroscopic and anthropometric examinations.
- Paleoecology: Studying the influence of ancient and modern ecological factors on the life activities and health conditions of the Azerbaijani population.

== See also ==
- Archaeology of Azerbaijan
