= Archaeological site of Uzun Rama =

Uzun Rama is a complex of burial mounds (kurgans) located in western Azerbaijan, in the Goranboy region along the Kürekçay River basin. The site serves as a kurgan cemetery in the South Caucasus and provides evidence for the study of burial mound traditions, funerary practices, and aspects of social organization from the Late Chalcolithic to the Early Iron Age.

== Location and archaeological landscape ==
Uzun Rama lies within a broader archaeological zone characterized by a high density of burial mounds distributed across the western Azerbaijani steppe. Remote sensing and survey work have identified more than 1,000 kurgans in the surrounding Kürekçay valley, indicating long-term and intensive use of the landscape for funerary purposes.

== History of research ==
Archaeological investigations at Uzun Rama have been conducted within both national and international research frameworks, including the Ganja Region Kurgan Archaeological Project (GaRKAP). Excavations have focused on individual kurgans as well as broader landscape surveys, incorporating geophysical prospection, stratigraphic excavation, and paleoanthropological analysis. Recent research has also employed advanced scientific techniques such as radiocarbon wiggle-matching to refine burial chronologies.

=== Late Chalcolithic – Early Bronze Age (c. 4th millennium BCE) ===
The earliest kurgans at Uzun Rama are dated to the second half of the 4th millennium BCE and are associated with the emergence of new burial traditions in the South Caucasus.

These early traditions were characterized by:

- Construction of burial mounds (kurgans) outside settlements
- Collective interments within chamber tombs
- Development of new ritual practices linked to changing belief systems

This funerary tradition is considered distinct from, and in some respects earlier than, that of the Kura-Araxes culture.

=== Early Bronze Age (c. 3500–3000 BCE) ===
During this period, Uzun Rama functioned as a major burial center with large kurgans containing collective burials. These tombs were likely used over extended periods and may have belonged to specific kin groups or tribes.

== Burial architecture and funerary practices ==
The kurgans at Uzun Rama exhibit complex construction techniques and ritual behaviors:

- Subterranean chamber tombs, often rectangular in plan
- Entrances (dromoi) typically located on the eastern side
- The use of timber, stone, and earth to construct and cover the mound
- Evidence of intentional burning after burial use

Excavations have shown that burial chambers were frequently set on fire after being filled, possibly as part of ritual closure ceremonies. Collective burials are a defining feature of early kurgans at the site, with some tombs containing the remains of dozens of individuals. One excavated kurgan yielded remains of more than 80 individuals, indicating long-term, communal use.

== Material culture ==
Artifacts recovered from Uzun Rama include:

- Handmade ceramics, sometimes showing textile impressions
- Beads and ornaments made of paste and other materials
- Bone tools and spindle whorls
- Wooden objects preserved in charred form

The ceramic assemblage differs from typical Kura-Araxes pottery, suggesting the presence of a distinct cultural tradition during the Early Bronze Age.

== Bioarchaeology ==
Human remains from the site were studied. Analyses indicate:

- Individuals of all age groups, from infants to adults
- Evidence of collective burial practices
- Limited signs of trauma and disease, though some indicators of physiological stress (e.g., anemia) were observed

Burning of burial chambers resulted in heavy fragmentation of skeletal remains, complicating biological analysis.

== See also ==
- Archaeology of Azerbaijan
- Bioarchaeology in Azerbaijan
- Archaeological site of Qarachinar
