= Gazma Cave =

Archaeological site in Azerbaijan

- Qazma mağarası (Azerbaijani)
- Location: Kangarli
- Region: Nakhchivan Autonomous Republic; Azerbaijan

Site notes
- Length: 22 m (72 ft)
- Width: 1–6.5 m (3 ft 3 in – 21 ft 4 in)
- Archaeologists: Mammadali Huseynov; A.G.Jafarov
- Discovered: 1983

Gazma Cave (Azerbaijani: Qazma mağarası) is a Paleolithic dwelling site discovered between Ordubad and Sharur districts in 1983. Gazma Cave is located 3 km northeast of Tananam village, 1450 m above the sea level.

== Discovery ==
The ancient site of Gazma cave was discovered in 1983 during the Paleolithic archeological expedition headed by M.M.Huseynov and A.G.Jafarov in Ordubad and Sharur regions. Archeological excavations were carried out there under the leadership of A.G.Jafarov in 1987–1990, and A.Zeynalov in 2008–2013.

== Findings ==
A large number of archaeological materials were found in the cave during the research. More than 17,000 unearthed fauna fossils were examined by D.V.Hajiyev and S.D.Aliyev and it was found out that they contained 24 species of fauna, some were used as tools. In addition to fauna fossils, 874 stone tools were also discovered in the cave. Among them there were 780 obsidians, 93 flints, and 1 tuff tools. Despite the fact that the obsidian reserve is located in Kalbajar mountains, the research has revealed that these stones were collected by cave dwellers from the bed of Arpachay. The form of the tools is similar to those derived from Azokh and Tağlar caves. The presence of several hearths in a small area in the cave indicates that primitive people living in Gazma utilized fire and lived here for a long time. During the Mousterian culture period, hunting played a particular role in the lives of Gazma inhabitants.

== Layers ==
6 cultural layers were discovered in the cave.

The first layer — consists of black soil. No archeological findings. The total thickness of the layer was 15–20 cm.

The second layer — consists of light-yellow clay soil. The difference between the first and second layers is clearly visible. No archeological findings. The total thickness of the layer was 20–25 cm.

The third layer — consists of dark-yellow clay soil. During the excavations, bone fossils were beginning to be discovered. This layer is slightly thicker. The total thickness of the layer was 35–40 cm.

The fourth layer — consists of light-yellowish clay soil layer. Rock fractures and stalactite fragments fallen from the upper part of the cave were recorded. Beginning from the fourth layer, stone tools were also discovered along with bone fossils. 8 pieces of stone tools were found in the layer. All of them were obsidian. The total thickness of the layer was 25–30 cm.

The fifth layer — consists of dark-yellow clay soil and light-gray layers in some areas. Rock fractures and stalactite fragments were recorded. Bones and stone tools were unearthed in the layer. 13 pieces of stone tools were found in the layer. 11 of them are obsidian and 2 are flint. The total thickness of the layer was 30–35 cm.

The sixth layer — consists of dark-brown clay soil. Unlike the other layers, in the sixth layer rock fractures and stalactite fragments were rarely found. Bones and stone tools were discovered in the layer.

== Gallery ==
Obsidian tools, Gazma Cave

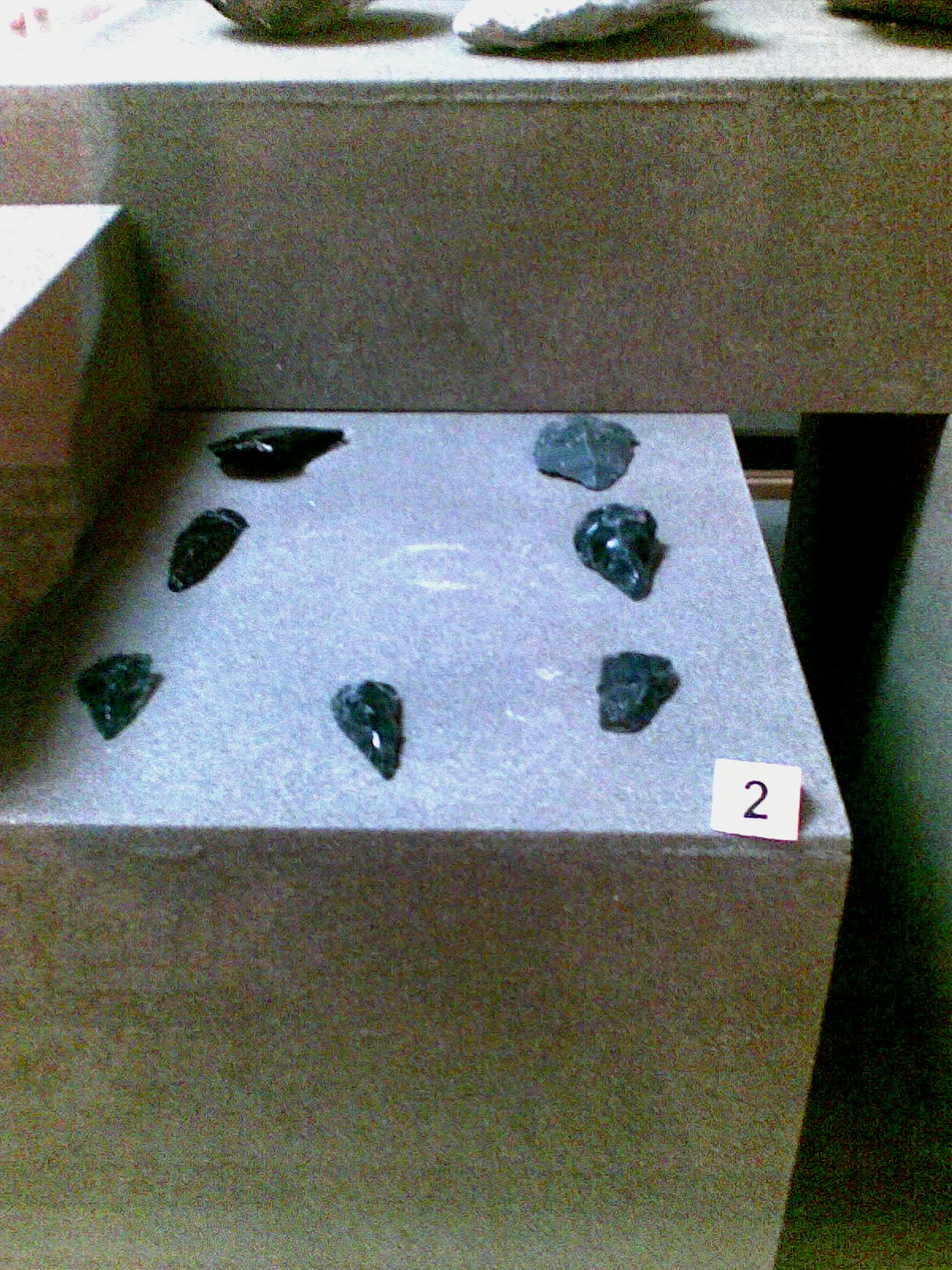

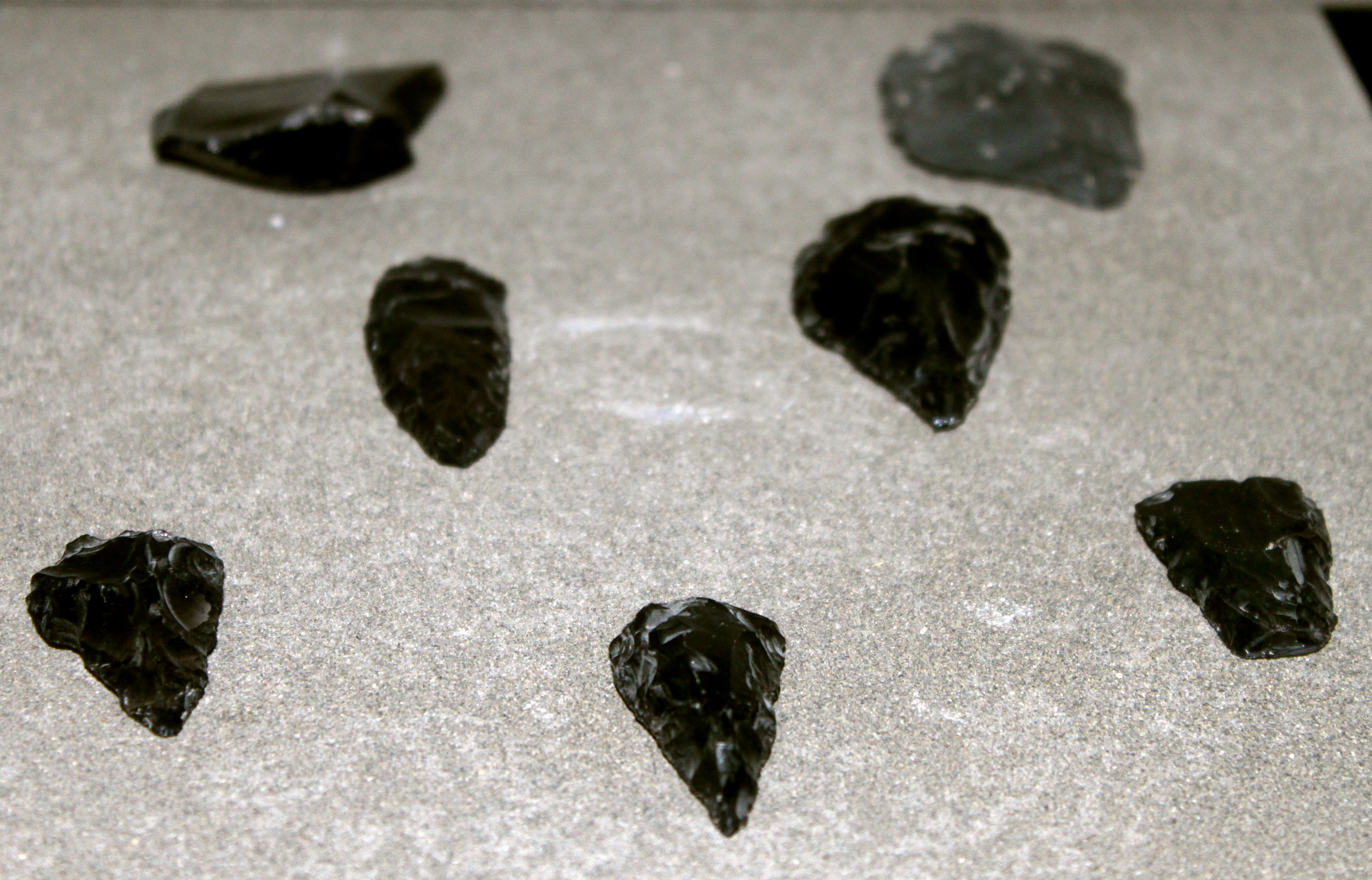
