= Archaeological site of Qaraçinar =

Prehistoric settlement in Azerbaijan

The Archaeological site of Qarachinar is a prehistoric settlement located in the basin of the Qarachay River along the eastern piedmont of the Lesser Caucasus in western Azerbaijan. The site lies near the modern city of Ganja and represents among the limited number of stratified prehistoric settlements in this region.

== Discovery and archaeological research ==
The site was first identified by the archaeologist Muzeffer Huseynov from the Institute of Archeology and Anthropology of ANAS. Systematic archaeological investigations at the site began in 2018-2019 as part of broader research focused on the prehistoric occupation of the region.

Since 2018, an Azerbaijani–French international archaeological expedition has been active at the settlement. The expedition has been led by Giulio Palumbi from France, with the participation of archaeologists from Italy and France. In 2020, research activities were temporarily suspended due to the COVID-19 pandemic, but they were resumed in 2023. The research forms part of a wider effort to document the archaeological record of the Qarachay River basin and to contextualize local developments within regional prehistoric frameworks.

Fieldwork has revealed a stratified sequence of occupation layers, indicating long-term or repeated settlement activity. The material assemblage includes architectural remains, ceramic fragments, and other cultural materials associated with the later phases of Kura-Araxes culture.

The site is primarily associated with the transition between the Late Chalcolithic period and the Early Bronze Age, a phase marked by significant social and economic transformations across the South Caucasus.

According to radiocarbon dating, some levels of the site belonged to Kura-Araxes occupation (2860-2570 cal BCE) and some to the Early-Kurgan/Bedeni phase (2575 1780 cal BCE).

Findings from the site suggest interactions between local traditions and broader regional processes, including shifts in settlement organization, subsistence strategies, and material culture. The evidence also contributes to discussions concerning the transition from earlier Chalcolithic communities to the more complex societies of the Early Bronze Age.

In April 2026, archaeologists published a study in PNAS investigating the culinary habits and ceramic usage of the Kura–Araxes culture, a widespread Bronze Age society in the South Caucasus. By integrating technological, morphological, use-wear, and biomolecular analysis of pottery from the Qarachinar, researchers found evidence for the consumption of grape-derived beverages. They also identified markers for cooking techniques, such as the heating of dairy and fats, as well as potential preservation methods involving fruits and conifer-derived products.

== See also ==
- Archaeology of Azerbaijan
- Archaeological site of Uzun Rama
