= Khynysli treasure =

Hoard of silver coins near Dere Khynysli, Azerbaijan

The Khynysli treasure (Azerbaijani: Xınıslı dəfinəsi) is a hoard of silver coins discovered near the village of Dere Khynysli in Shamakhi district of Azerbaijan.

== Discovery ==
The treasure was found in 1958 along with the remains of the Khynysli settlement amid economic work on the hill, during the laying of a grape plantation.

There were four cultural layers found in Khynysli.

More than 300 coins were examined. The hoard contains both Caucasian Albanian coins of local coinage, as well as coins belonging to the Roman Empire (denarius), Athens (5 tetradrachms), Thrace (3 tetradrachms), Bithynia (7 tetradrachms), Seleucids (76 tetradrachms), Arsacids (161 tetradrachms) and Pontus (1 tetradrachm) and more than 70 local imitations.

According to historian Ilyas Babayev, the treasure was presumably buried around the third quarter of the I century BC. The earliest coin of the hoard is the tetradrachm, minted in the name of Lysimachus (323-281 BC) in Thrace, and the latest is the Arsacid drachm of Phraates III (70-57 BC).

The average milestone of the coins ranges from 3.22 to 1.49 grams (0.114 to 0.053 oz).

Along with the coins, a fragment of silver jewelry (5.52 grams [0.195 oz]), a flat silver board (58.74 grams [2.072 oz]), and a silver ingot (29.96 grams [1.057 oz]) were found. A large number of Albanian coins were first discovered in the treasure trove of Khynysli. Based on these coins, it was possible to determine the origin of coins found earlier in various places. The hoard from Khynysli shows there was an extended monetary turnover in Caucasian Albania.

The treasure is on display at the Museum of the History of Azerbaijan in Baku.

== See also ==
Archaeology of Azerbaijan
