= Buzeyir Cave =

Cave and archaeological site in Azerbaijan

- Büzeyir mağarası (Azerbaijani); Byzaj noğ (Talysh)
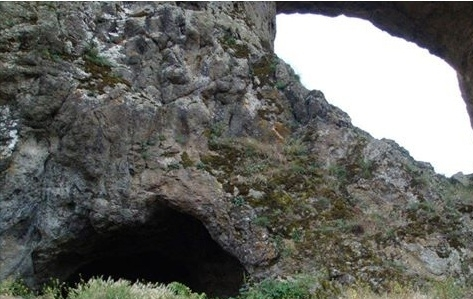

- location in Azerbaijan
- 38°43′36″N 48°23′46″E
- Type: Archaeological site
- Location: Buzeyir, Lerik, Azerbaijan

History
- Built: c. 70,000 years ago

Site notes
- Discovered: 1985

Buzeyir Cave (Azerbaijani: Büzeyir mağarası, Talysh: Byzaj noğ) is an archaeological site and Paleolithic place of human habitation. The cave is located on the left bank of the Zuvandchay River, at the top of Delikli-Dash Mountain, 3 km (1.9 mi) at an altitude of 1,640 m (5,380 ft) above sea level and to the east of Büzeyir village in Lerik Rayon, Azerbaijan.

The cave was discovered in 1985, during an archaeological expedition in the Lankaran, Lerik, and Masally Rayons under the guidance of Asadulla Jafarov. Items made of stone and sharpened bones of animals from the Paleolithic were unearthed during subsequent archaeological excavations.

== History ==
As a result of the archaeological exploration in the Zuvandcai Valley, caves and mountain shelters were discovered. The territory of the Lerik region is the Talysh Ridge along the border with Iran, followed by the Peshtasar Range in the north, and then the Burovar Range. The Zuvan pool is located between the Talish and Peshtasar ranges. The highest peaks are Kemyurga (2.493 km) and Gyzyurdudur (2.433 km). The Talysh Mountains, formed mainly during the third geological period, are the continuation of the Small Caucasus. In contrast to the Small Caucasus, volcanic caves were formed in the Talysh Mountains. The tops of Talish mountains are completely naked. Vegetation is mostly rare forests, wooded meadows and mountain forests. During archaeological research, several caves were discovered on the 9th kilometer of the Lerik-Zuvand road. The Buzeir Cave is located on the 9th kilometer of the Lerik-Buseir road, on the left bank of the Zuvandchay River, 3 km east of the village of Buzeir. The length of the cave is 12 meters, its width is 5 or 6 meters, and its height is 2.5 meters (from the soil sediment). There were large stones fallen from the roof at the front of the cave before the excavations started.

== Archaeological investigations ==
Scientific researches of the average paleolithic camps in Azerbaijan provide information on the way of life of people living here, instrument as sharp knives, curry-combs for making and hunting economy, as well as on the Neanderthal type of population during the culture of Moustier.

During the archaeological excavations carried out in the cave, stones and hunting bones of animals dating from the Paleolithic period were found. Around 74 artefacts were discovered in the Buzeir cave.

In stone products, clawed cores, simple knuckles, one-eyed white handkerchiefs, scales and boards were found. As a result of archaeological research conducted in Azerbaijan from 1953 to 2003, the caves of Azykh (III layer), Taglar, Dashsalakhly, Damchi, Kazma and Buzeir, related to the Middle Paleolithic and Mousterian cultures were studied and studied.

Within the framework of Intas 2000 programme, European scholars such as Henry de Lumley conducted scientific research in Buzeyir cave in September-October 2002.

The archaeological expedition led by Asadulla Jafarzadeh (Javarov) discovered five archaeological layers for the first time here.

During the archaeological excavations of the Paleolithic archaeological expedition in 1985, 1990, and 2007, six layers of archaeological excavations were recorded in Buzeyr's multi-layer camp.

The first layer consists of the black earth layer. Medieval, bronze, and eneolithic clay dishes were found. The layer thickness was 5-7 cm.

The second layer consists of a layer of yellow glycine. During the archaeological excavations carried out on the second layer, numerous bronze age, eneolithic and medieval clay dishes were found. The thickness of the second layer is 40-45 cm.

The third layer consists of a layer of grayish-yellow clay. Remains of animal hunting bones and 6 stone products were found inside the layer. The thickness of this layer was 32-35 cm.

The fourth layer consists of a layer of gray soil. The thickness of the formation was 25-30 cm.

The fifth layer is a layer of dark yellow soil. Single remains of rocks, 12 bone fractures and 23 stone products were found in the structure of the formation. The thickness of this layer was 50-55 cm.

The sixth layer consists of a light yellow sand layer. The sixth layer consisted of rocks falling from the ceiling of the caves. The thickness of the described given was 35-40 cm.

According to Asadulla Jafarzadeh, the discovery of the cave of Buzeyir proves that the ancient paleolithic man inhabited 60,000-80,000 years ago here.

According to Hajiyev's scientific-archeological research, Neandertals have hunted 15 species of animals in Buzeyir cave.

== See also ==
- Mousterian culture
- History of Azerbaijan
