= Azykhantrop =

Hominin fossil

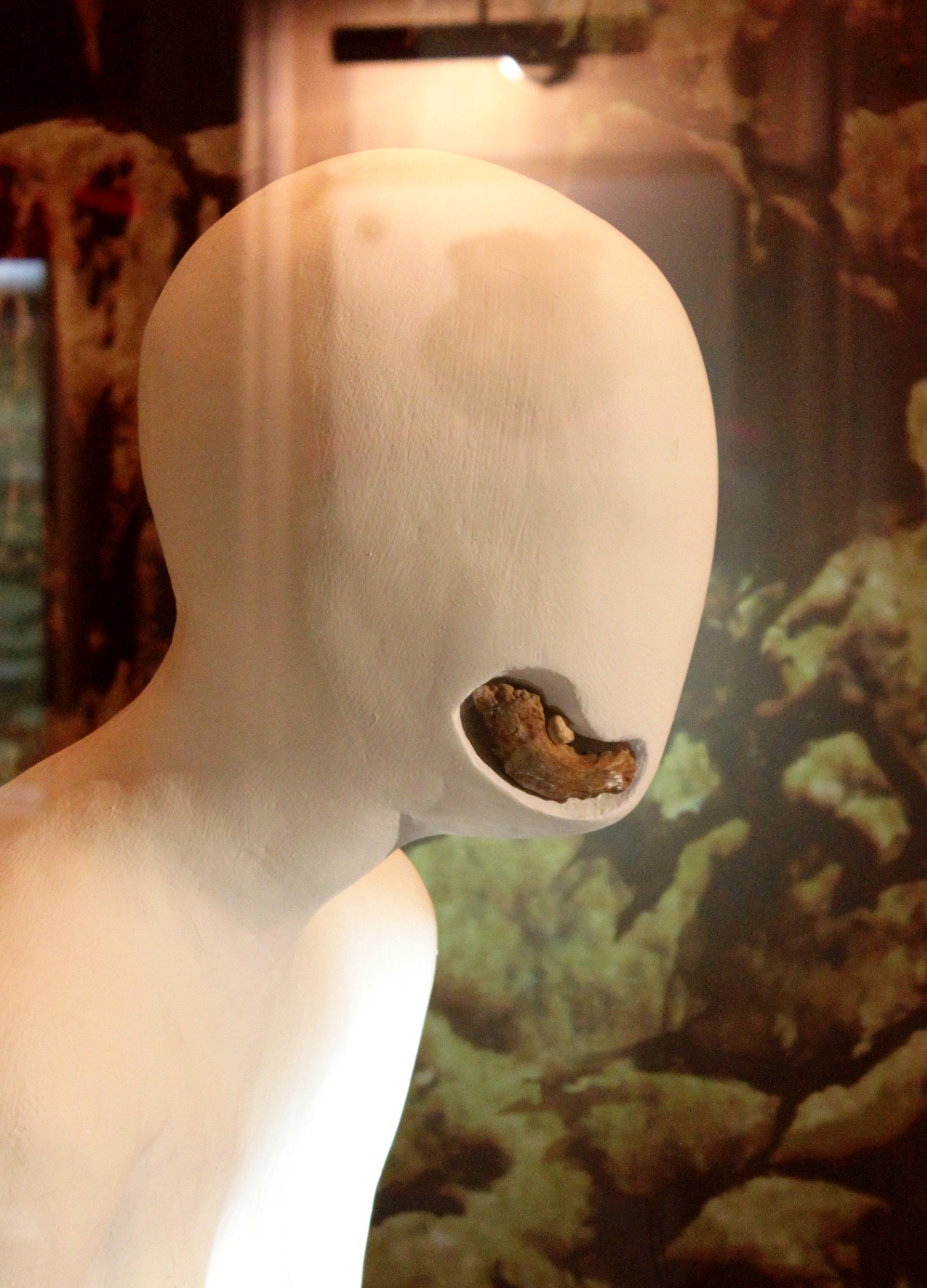
- Lower jaw of Azykhantrop, in the Azerbaijan State Museum of History
- Common name: Azykhantrop
- Species: Homo heidelbergensis
- Age: 250,000 years
- Place discovered: Azykh, Khojavend, Azerbaijan
- Date discovered: 1968
- Discovered by: Mammadali Huseynov

The Azykhantrop, or Azykh Man, is the lower jaw of a presumably female Homo heidelbergensis pre-Neanderthal.

The fossil was found in the Azykh Cave in the Hadrut District of the Nagorno-Karabakh Autonomous Oblast, Azerbaijan SSR (present-day Khojavend District of Azerbaijan), in 1968, by Azerbaijani archaeologist Mammadali Huseynov.

No concrete date has been produced about the age of the fossil, but estimates range from 450,000 to 50,000 years ago.

Acheulean Paleolithic implements and remains of fire were also found out in the cave. Starting in the mid 1990s, researchers from Armenia, England, Ireland and Spain began renewed excavations at Azykh Cave.
