= Ərkivan =

Ərkivan Ákon
- Municipality
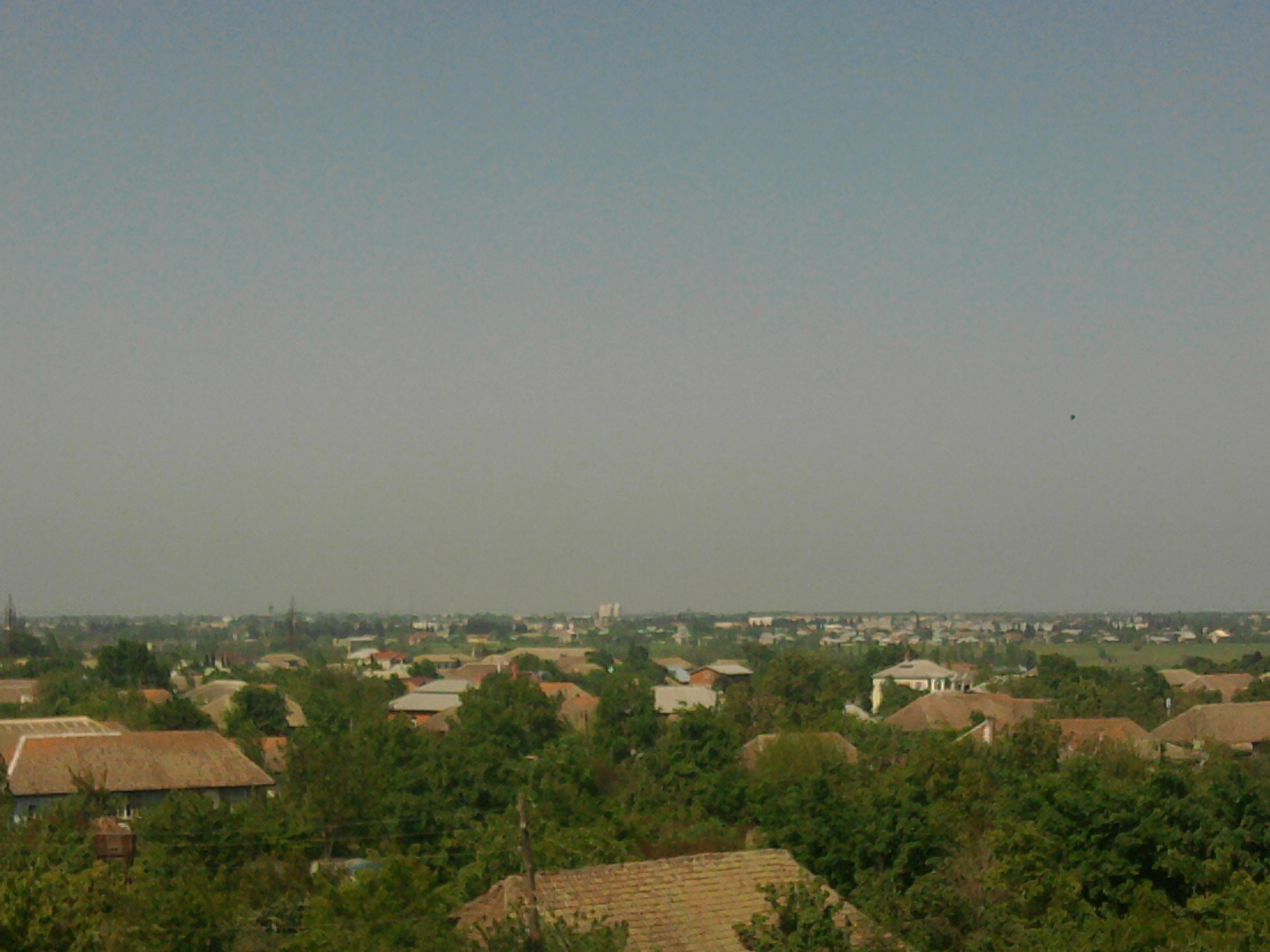

- Location within Azerbaijan
- Coordinates: 39°01′06″N 48°39′00″E
- Country: Azerbaijan
- Rayon: Masally

Population (2014)
  - Total: 15,654
- Time zone: UTC+4 (AZT)

Ərkivan (Talysh: Ákon) is a village and the most populous municipality in the Masally Rayon of Azerbaijan. With 15,654 inhabitants, Ərkivan is the largest rural community in Azerbaijan.

Arkivan settlement of Masalli region of the Republic of Azerbaijan is one of the ancient settlements of the republic. The findings of the Bronze and Iron Ages found here also prove it. In 1985, the Paleolithic archeological expedition of the Institute of History of ANAS under the leadership of Professor Asadulla Jafarov conducted archeological excavations in the territory of Arkivan on the right bank of the Vilesh River. During this research, stone products of the Upper Paleolithic period were found in the territory of Arkivan. This discovery allows us to say that ancient people settled in the territory of Arkivan.

Arkivan settlement is located 2 km west of Masalli, on the right bank of the Vilash River, at the foot of the Talish Mountains, in the Lankaran lowland. The Lankaran Lowland is located between the Talish Mountains and the Caspian Sea.

Arkivan settlement was included in Dashtvand district, one of the 8 districts of Talish khanate. It was a very rich place, covering the Talish Mountains in the west, the Caspian Sea and the Mughan Plain in the east, the present-day Boradigah in the south, and Goytapa in the north. Arkivan is considered to be the center of this district, as if it were a ring. Some researchers say that Dashtvand and Arkiva are generally the same place. According to S. Kazimbayoglu, "Arkivan, one of the largest districts of the Talysh khanate, was located in the north of the khanate, the western part was mountainous and the eastern part was plain. It borders Safidasht district and Iran."

According to the name of Dashtvand district, many researchers call Arkivan a place by the sea. Until recent years, the remains of anchors found in several places in the village further strengthen the possibility that this was a seaside settlement. The fact that the level of the Caspian Sea has risen sharply 6-7 times in recent millennia, and the fact that a number of places, including the city of Lankaran, have been flooded, once again confirms this idea.

A number of historians claim that Sheikh Safi (1252-1334) was in Arkivan.

The toponym Arkivan is also found in the map of the 16th century in the book "Historical Geography of Azerbaijan" published in Russian.

Russian Tsar Peter I (1672-1725) presented the Arkivan settlement to Bernard Alexandrovich, known among Russian figures by the nickname "Kerch".

Until now, there are various opinions, legends and folk etymology about the origin of the Arkivan paleotoponymy.

One of the legends says that the village was also called Arkivan because the first inhabitants of this village spoke very arkan. "Arkivan" means arkyana, men, people who speak with courage.

A group of linguists note that the toponym Arkivan was formed in connection with the name "tree", "shrub". The village was named Arkivan because it was supposed to be a tree species in the area.

"Erk" in Persian means "fortress", "reference", "i" unifying sound, and "van" means place. Arkiva means a village built near the fortress, on the site of a fortress. Arkivan means a fortified place, a fortified place. "Erk" means castle, "van" means place. In another source - Vagif Yusifli's book "Arkivan and Arkivan people" it is mentioned: Arkivan, Arkavan, Ardjuvan and Akon. "Akon" is from the word "ekon" in the Talysh language. "A" is the plural suffix "ke" ev, "on". The most convincing variant of this toponym in Talysh is "Arkon", which means masculine.
