= Asadulla Jafarov =

- Azerbaijani: Əsədulla Cəfərov
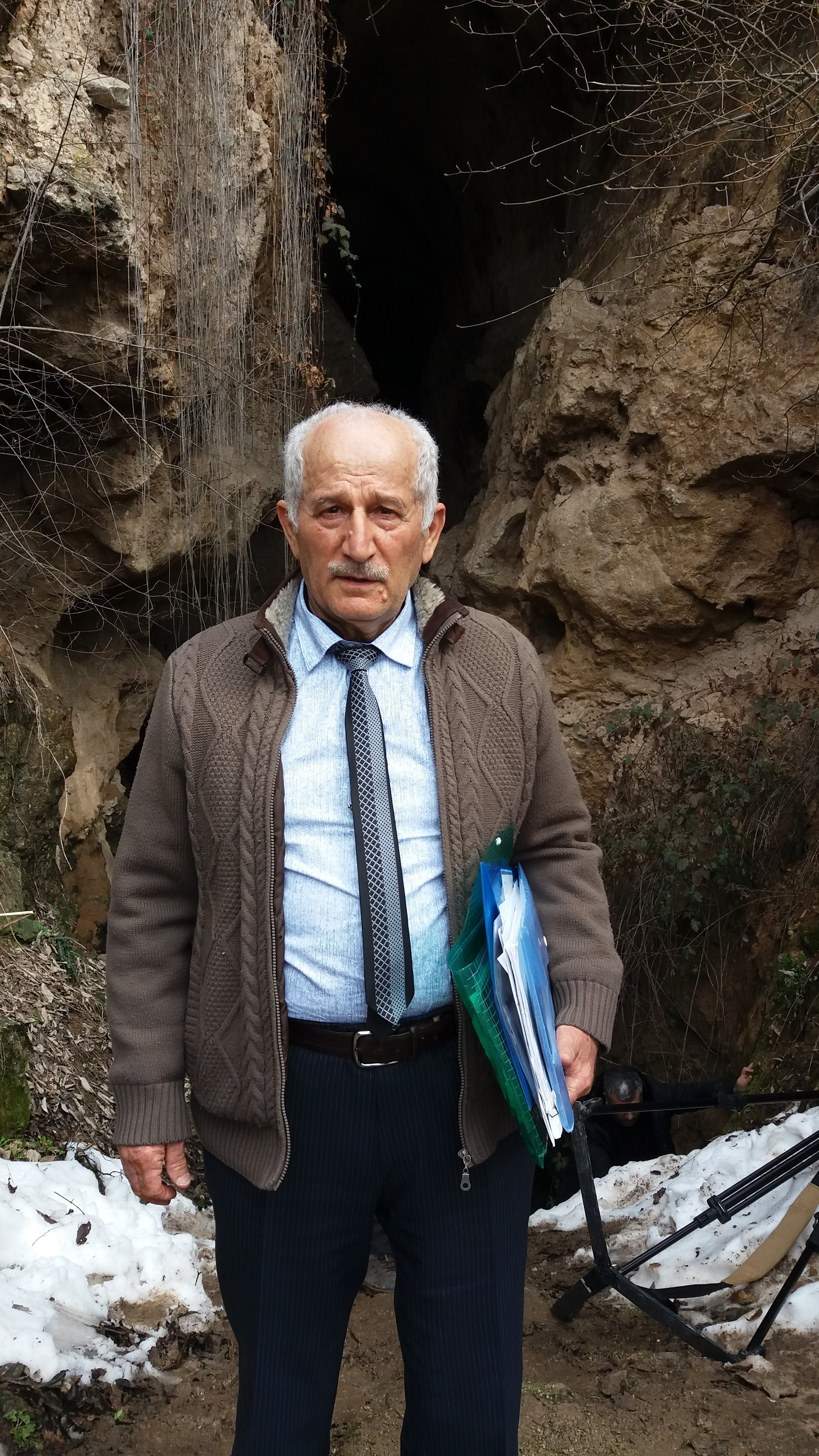
- Jafarov in front of the Azykh Cave, March 17, 2021.
- Born: 14 March 1949 (age 77); Arkivan, Masally District, Azerbaijan SSR, Soviet Union
- Citizenship: Azerbaijan
- Education: Baku State University
- Awards: Full list
- Scientific career
- Fields: Archeology
- Workplaces: Azerbaijan National Academy of Sciences

Asadulla Qudrat oghlu Jafarov (Azerbaijani: Əsədulla Qüdrət oğlu Cəfərov) is an Azerbaijani archaeologist and paleontologist, head of the "Stone Age Archeology" Department of the Institute of Archaeology, Ethnology and Anthropology of ANAS, Doctor of Historical Sciences, professor.

== Biography ==
Asadulla Jafarov was born in 1949 in the village of Arkivan, Masally district.

In 1966, he graduated from the secondary school in the village of Arkivan and entered the history department of the Azerbaijan State University, which he graduated in 1973.

In 1968–1970, he worked at the Museum of Natural History of the Institute of Geology of the Academy of Sciences of Azerbaijan. Since 1971, he has been working at the Institute of History, Archeology and Ethnography of the Azerbaijan National Academy of Sciences.

In 1973–1974, he served in the Soviet Army. From November 1, 1975, to November 1, 1977, he worked as a research intern at the Leningrad branch of the Institute of Archeology of the Academy of Sciences of the Soviet Union. From November 1, 1977, to January 9, 1984 – junior researcher at the Institute of History of the Academy of Sciences of Azerbaijan, from January 10, 1984, to December 1, 1992 – senior researcher, from December 1, 1992 – From 1991 to 1994 he worked as a leading researcher, and since 1994 – head of the Stone Age Archaeology Department of the Institute of Archaeology, Ethnology and Anthropology.

In 1979, he defended his PhD dissertation at the academic council of the Leningrad Branch of the Institute of Archaeology of the USSR Academy of Sciences and received the academic degree of candidate of historical sciences. In 1980, for the monograph "Mousterian Culture of Azerbaijan" he was awarded the Komsomol Republican Prize in Science and Technology. On December 25, 1992, he defended his doctoral dissertation on the topic “Middle Paleolithic of Azerbaijan” at the Academic Council of the Institute of History of the Academy of Sciences of Azerbaijan.

In 2001, at an international conference held in Tautavel (France), he was elected as the coordinator of the INTAS-2000 program for Azerbaijan and received a grant. In 2001 and 2003, he conducted joint scientific research with European scientists in France for 3 months and presented scientific reports on the ancient history of Karabakh. In 2002, he won the "100 Outstanding Scientists of Azerbaijan" competition.

In 2015, by the decision of the European Publishing House Award Commission, he was awarded the prize for contributions to the protection of our national and spiritual values, active intellectual position in society, successful scientific research in the field of studying the ancient history of Karabakh, the Paleolithic sites of Azykh, Taghlar, Gazma at the level of modern requirements of archaeological science, my numerous scientific and journalistic works. For his books, he was awarded the "Gold Medal" as the best patriotic research scientist, education of patriotic feelings in youth, as well as merits in the history of the development of archaeological science in Azerbaijan.

For more than 50 years of work at ANAS, Asadulla Jafarov wrote 8 books, 142 scientific articles and more than 100 scientific and journalistic articles on various stages of the development of the history of the Stone Age and the primitive communal system of Azerbaijan, the Caucasus and Europe.

== Notable works ==
- Mousterian culture of Azerbaijan (based on the materials of the Taglar cave). 1983
- In the Guruchay gorge. B., 1990, 6 p.l.
- Morning of humanity. B., 1994. 5.5 p.l.
- Middle Paleolithic of Azerbaijan, 1999
- First inhabitants of Azerbaijan, 2004, 20 p.l.
- Archaeology of Azerbaijan. Volume I, 2008
- Paleolithic sites of Karabakh, Baku, 2017.
- Azykh Cave - the Oldest Prehistoric Site in Azerbaijan. Baku, 2024.
