= Sergei Khudyakov =

Soviet marshal of aviation

Sergei Alexandrovich Khudyakov
- Armenian: Արմենակ Խանֆերյանց; Russian: Серге́й Алекса́ндрович Худяко́в
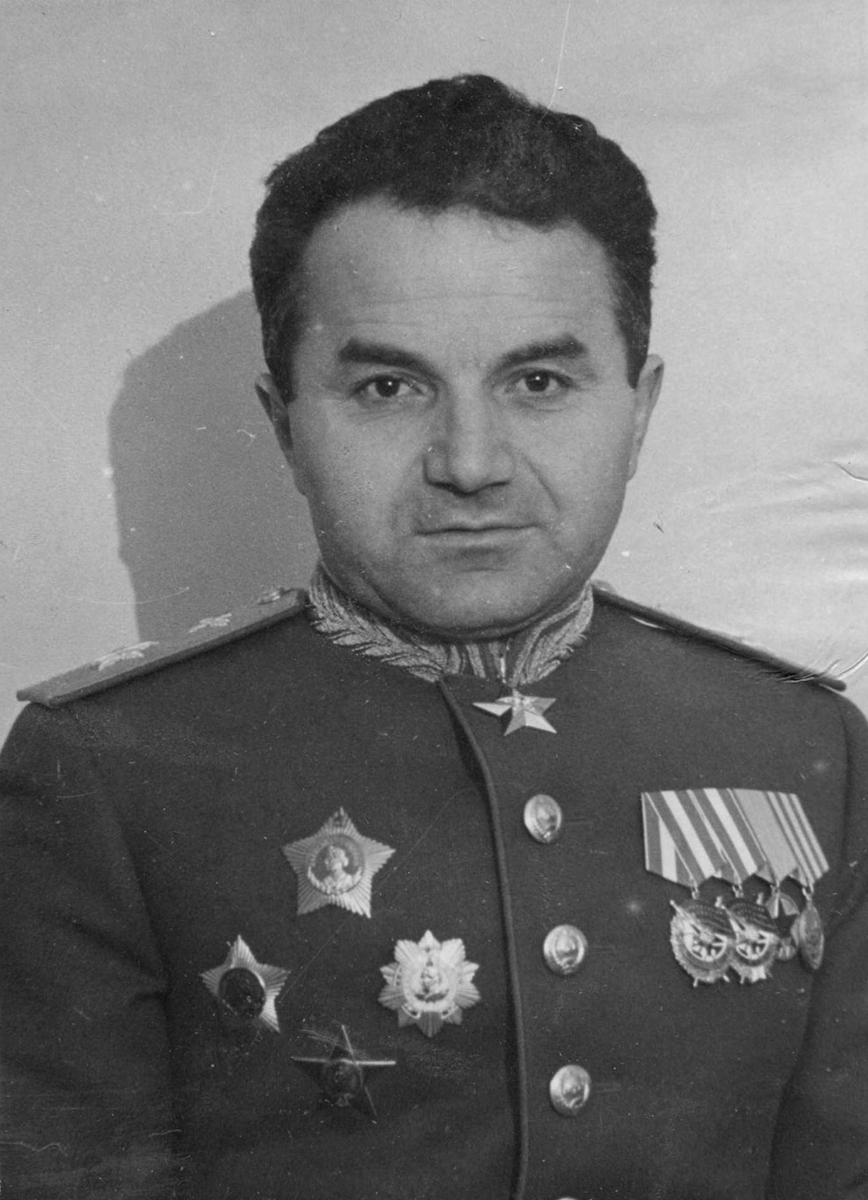
- Khudyakov in 1944
- Born: Armenak Khanferiants; 7 January 1902; Mets Tagher village, Shushinsky Uyezd, Elisabethpol Governorate, Russian Empire
- Died: 18 April 1950 (aged 48); Moscow, Russian SFSR, Soviet Union
- Burial place: Donskoi Cemetery
- Spouse: Varvara Petrovna
- Military career
- Allegiance: Soviet Union
- Branch: Soviet Air Forces
- Service years: 1918–1945
- Rank: Marshal of Aviation
- Commands: Chief of the Air Staff; 1st Air Army; 12th Air Army
- Conflicts: Russian Civil War; World War II
- Awards: Order of Lenin; Order of the Red Banner (2); Order of the Red Star see below

Sergei Alexandrovich Khudyakov (Armenian: Սերգեյ Ալեքսանդրի Խուդյակով; Russian: Серге́й Алекса́ндрович Худяко́в); born Armenak Artemi Khanferiants (Armenian: Արմենակ Արտեմի Խանփերյանց, 7 January 1902 [O.S. 25 December 1901] – 18 April 1950), was a Soviet Armenian Marshal of the aviation.

== Russian Revolution ==
Armenak Khanferiants (or Khanperiants) was born in 1902 in the village of Mets Tagher (Böyük Tağlar), Shushinsky Uyezd, Elisabethpol Governorate, Russian Empire. His father died in 1908, leaving a widow with three sons. Khanferiants travelled to Baku to study and started working at oilfields owned by Armenian tycoon and philanthropist Alexander Mantashev. In 1918, he was involved in the production of the newspaper Iskra.

While in Baku, he joined the Bolsheviks and organized the Red Guards of Baku in April 1918. While he was in Astrakhan during the Russian Civil War, he was saved from drowning in a steamer sunk by a British gunboat by his friend, Sergei Khudyakov, who was later killed fighting the Whites. Khanferiants adopted Sergei's name as his own as memorial to the man who saved his life. He continued to serve as a cavalry officer until 1920. In 1929, Khudyakov was admitted to the Tiflis Cavalry School, and in 1931 went to Moscow to attend the Zhukovsky Military Air Academy. He graduated with honors in 1936. Khudyakov became head of the Operations Branch of the Air Staff in 1937 and Chief of Logistics Management Air Force in 1938.

== World War II ==
The war greatly accelerated his career, and he jumped four ranks in just three years. During the Great Patriotic War (1941–1945), he was chief of staff of the Air Force and commander of the Air Force of the Western Front, chief of staff of the Red Army's Air Force, commander of the 1st Air Army, chief of staff and deputy commander of the Red Army's Air Force.

As the chief of staff of the Air Forces of the Western Front, he participated in the successful defence of Moscow.

Aviation units under his command took part in the offensive of the Western Front forces in the Rzhev-Sychevka direction and supported the ground troops in the Rzhev-Vyazma operation. In 1943 Marshal Khudyakov coordinated combat operations of the Air Force of the Voronezh and Steppe Fronts in the Battle of Kursk and the Battle for the Dnieper. During the Battle of Kursk, his 14-year-old son Victor was killed in an enemy air raid. Victor's body was taken to Moscow and was buried in the Novodevichy Cemetery.

He was tasked with organizing his air flight of the Soviet delegation to the Tehran Conference in 1943. He fulfilled his assignment of the Supreme Command.

Khudyakov became chief of staff and deputy commander of the Red Army Air Force in May 1943 and coordinated air operations to complete victory in the Battle of the Dnieper. He then took part in the Iasi-Kishinev Front. In August 1944, by the Decree of the Presidium of the Supreme Soviet of the Soviet Union Sergei Alexandrovich, Khudyakov was given the rank of Marshal of Aviation.

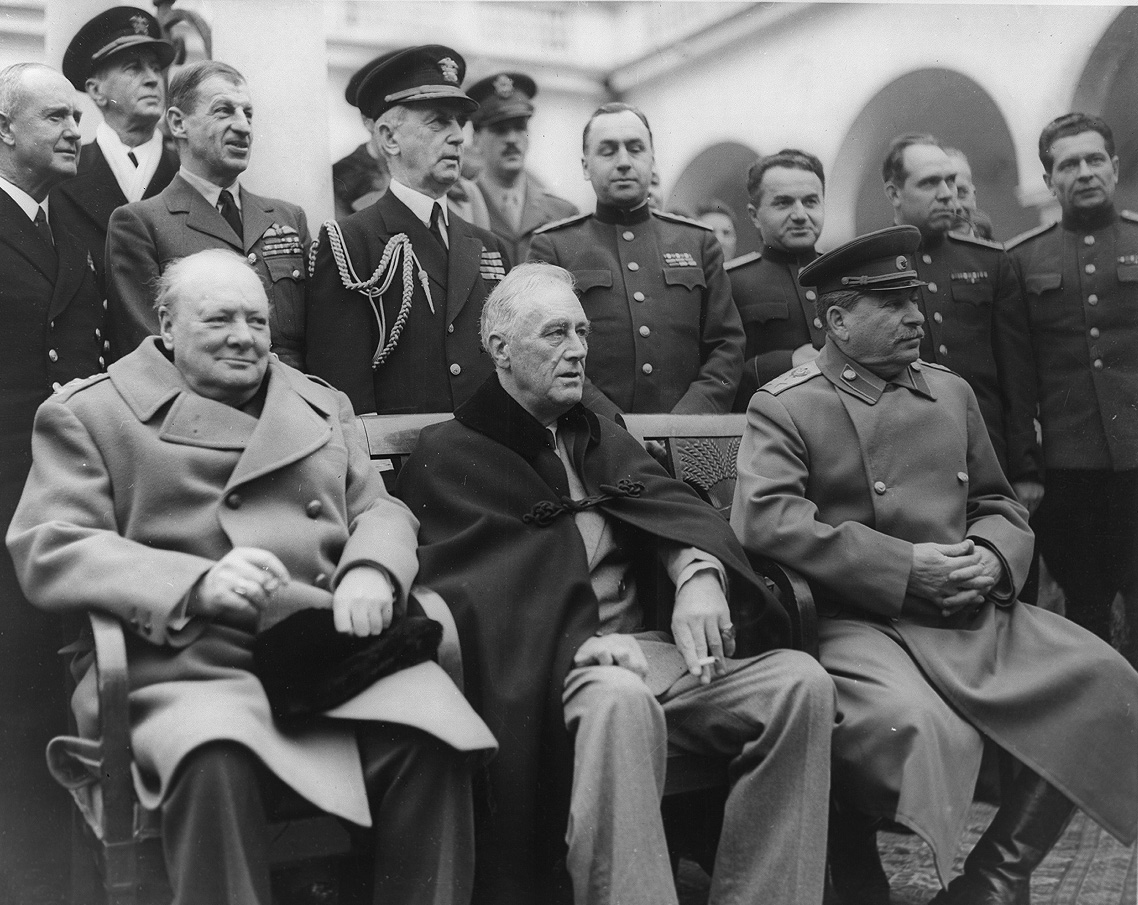
Khudyakov is shown standing behind Stalin in the Yalta Conference

In February 1945, he took part in the Yalta Conference of the Big Three as a military adviser. Later in 1945, he helped direct the defeat of the Imperial Japanese Army in the Far East as commander of the 12th Air Army.

== Arrest and execution ==
On 14 December 1946, he was arrested in Chita and taken to Moscow, where he was accused of having been recruited as a spy by the British. An investigation of the case lasted for more than four years and ended in 1949. He was sentenced to death and was executed on 18 April 1950 on the same day at the Don Cemetery.

His wife and younger son were also arrested on 13 January 1951 as family members of a traitor to the motherland and sent to Krasnoyarsk Krai in the Taseyevsky District. In accordance with the Decree of the Presidium of the Supreme Soviet of the Soviet Union on 27 March 1953, amnesty was granted to his family and they were allowed to return to Moscow from exile.

== Rehabilitation ==
After Stalin's death, the Supreme Soviet began a process of rehabilitation for victims of political repression.

In August 1954, in the Chief Military Prosecutor's Office began a review of the archival materials of Sergei Khudyakov's case. The chief military prosecutor sent the case for reconsideration by the Military Collegium of the Supreme Court of the Soviet Union with a proposal to revoke the sentence because of newly discovered evidence. This document called him by his real first and last name for the first time—Armenak Khanferiants. The retrial by the Military Collegium of the Supreme Court found that the prosecution of Khudyakov/Khanferiants had lacked any objective basis.

On 18 August 1954, the Military Collegium of the Supreme Court decided: the judgment of 18 April 1950 in respect of Sergei Alexandrovich Khudyakov, who is also Armenak Khanferyants, is cancelled on newly discovered evidence.

By decree of the Presidium of the Supreme Soviet, Khudyakov was rehabilitated by the court on 6 July 1965 and was posthumously restored to the military rank of Air Marshal and his awards.

== Memory ==
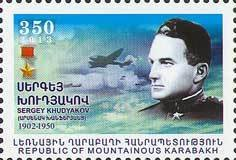
Khudyakov on a 2013 stamp of Nagorno-Karabakh

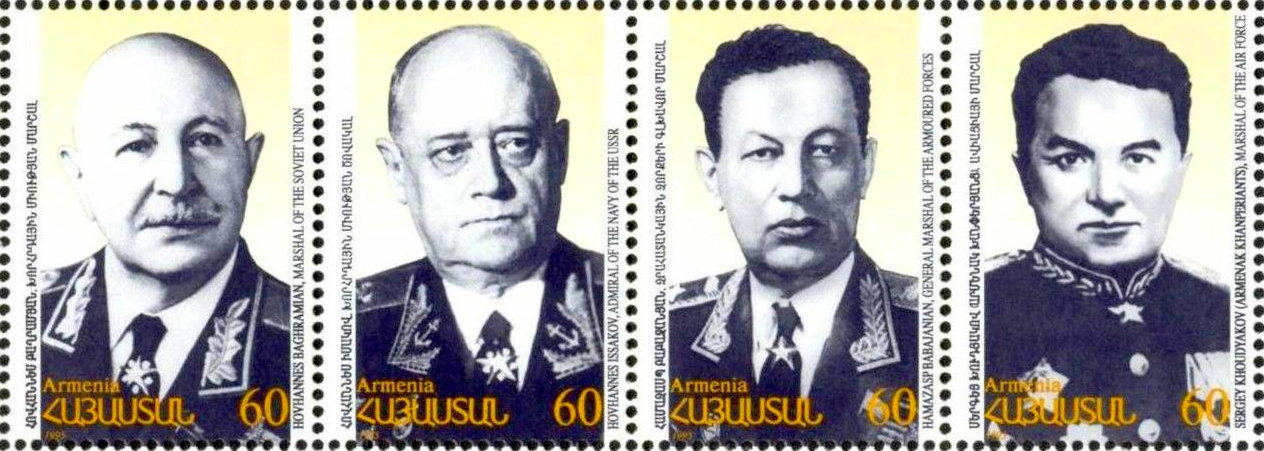
World War II Armenian heroes stamps: Bagramyan, Isakov, Babadzhanian, Khudyakov

Many books and monographs have been written about Khudyakov and many streets and avenues in the former Soviet Union are named after him.

A museum of Khudyakov is located in his home village of Mets Tagher in the Nagorno-Karabakh Republic. The village came under Azerbaijani control in November 2020; satellite imagery from July 2021 indicate Khudyakov's statue outside the museum has been destroyed. On 1 April 2005, an institute of the Armenian Air Force was named after him. On 9 May 2010, Khudyakov's grandson, Lieutenant Colonel Vardan Khanferyants led a column of Armenian soldiers at the 2010 Moscow Victory Day Parade on Red Square in honor of the 65th anniversary of the victory in World War II. His other grandson now works in the Russian Foreign Ministry.

== Awards and honors ==
USSR

Order of Lenin
Order of the Red Banner, twice
Order of Suvorov, 1st class
Order of Suvorov 2nd class
Order of Kutuzov, 1st class
Order of the Red Star
Order of the Badge of Honour
Jubilee Medal "XX Years of the Workers' and Peasants' Red Army"
Medal "For the Defence of Moscow"
Medal "For the Victory over Germany in the Great Patriotic War 1941–1945"
Medal "For the Victory over Japan"

Foreign

Legion of Honour, Commander (France)
Croix de Guerre, with Palm (France)
