= Mets Taghlar =

Mets Taghlar / Mets Tagher Մեծ Թաղլար / Մեծ Թաղեր Mets Tağlar • Böyük Tağlar
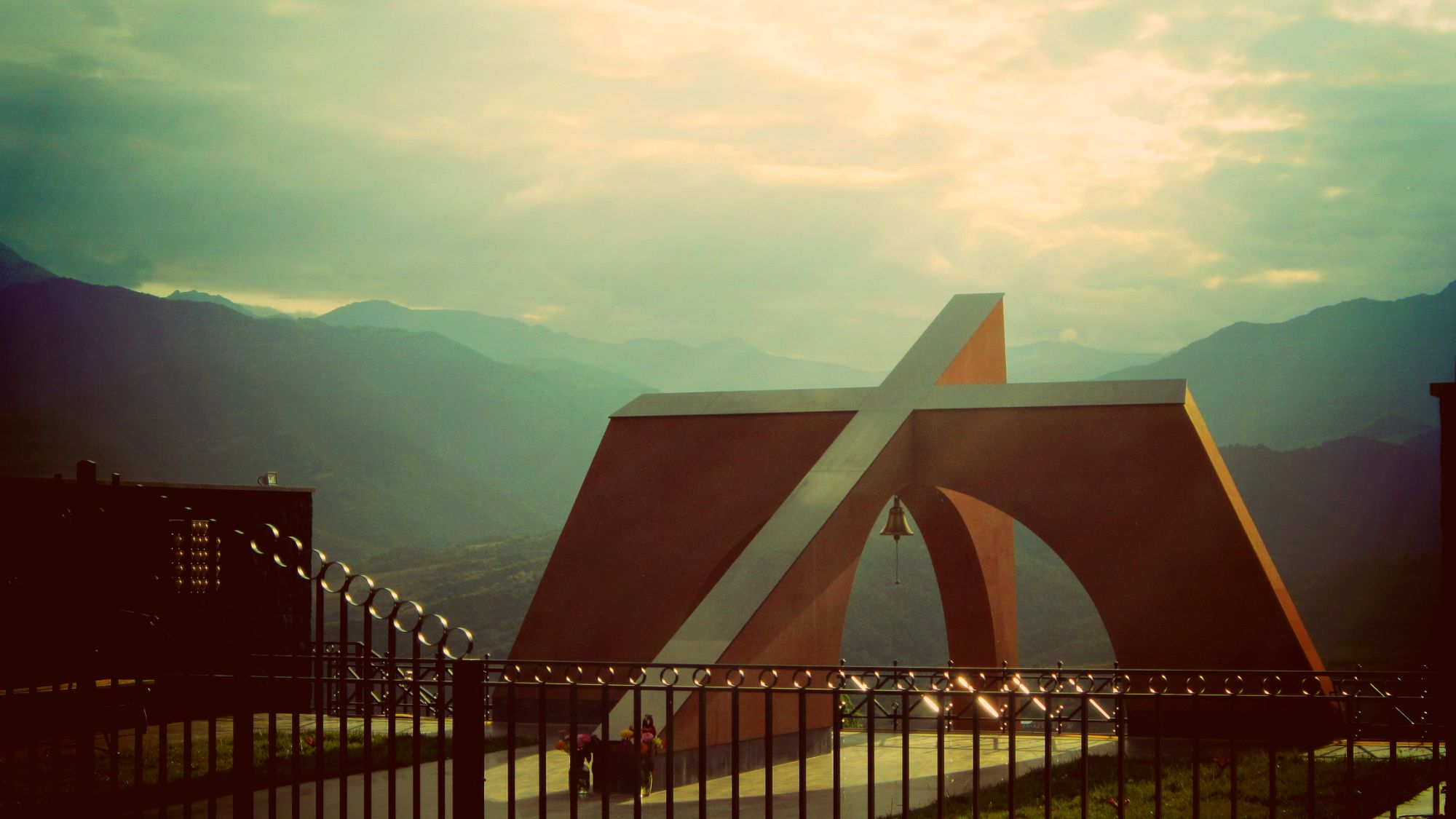

- Location within Azerbaijan
- Coordinates: 39°37′06″N 46°57′17″E
- Country: Azerbaijan
- District: Khojavend
- Elevation: 900 m (3,000 ft)

Population (2015)
  - Total: 1,509
- Time zone: UTC+4 (AZT)

Mets Taghlar (Armenian: Մեծ Թաղլար; Russian: Мец Тагла́р; Azerbaijani: Mets Tağlar), Mets Tagher (Armenian: Մեծ Թաղեր, lit. 'Big quarter') or Boyuk Taghlar (Azerbaijani: Böyük Tağlar) is a village in the Khojavend District of Azerbaijan, in the disputed region of Nagorno-Karabakh. The village had an ethnic Armenian-majority population prior to the 2020 Nagorno-Karabakh war, and also had an Armenian majority in 1989. After the capture of the village in 2020 by Azerbaijani forces, large portions of the village along with several historical objects were destroyed by Azerbaijani authorities.

== Etymology ==
The village was known as Tag or Taglyar (pre-reform Russian: Тагъ; Тагляръ) during the Russian Empire. Later, the village became known as Mets Taghlar during the Soviet period. The name Mets Tagher derives from two Armenian words, Mets, meaning great, large, or big, and Tagh, meaning quarter (of a city).

== History ==
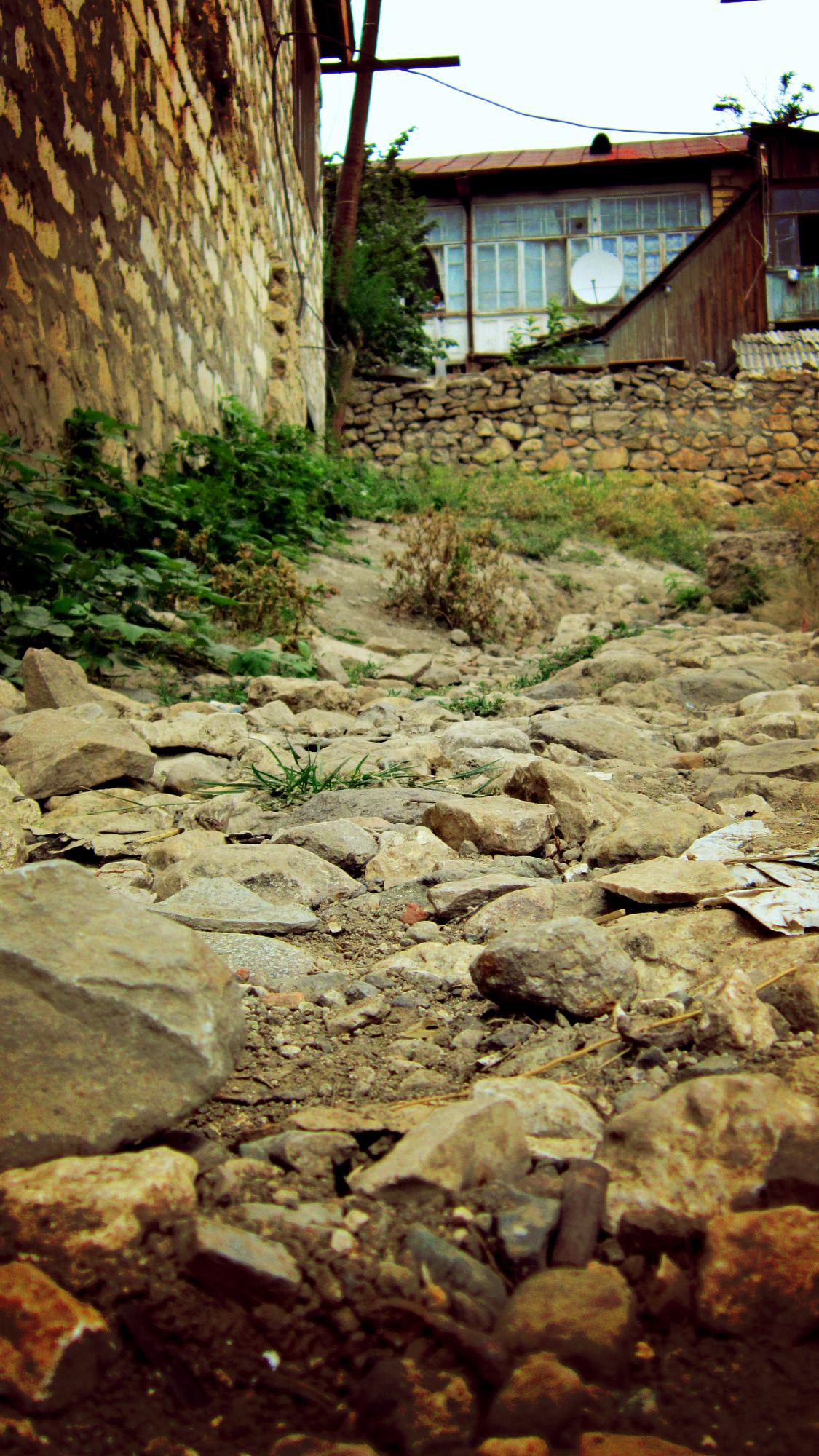

During the Russian Empire, Mets Taghlar was part of its own rural commune (сельское общество) within the second subcounty (uchastok) of the Shusha uezd of the Elizavetpol Governorate within the Caucasus Viceroyalty. During the Soviet period, the village was a part of the Hadrut District of the Nagorno-Karabakh Autonomous Oblast. The village came under the control of Armenian forces during the First Nagorno-Karabakh War, on October 2, 1992, and subsequently became part of the Hadrut Province of the Republic of Artsakh.

The village was captured by Azerbaijani forces on 9 November 2020 during the 2020 Nagorno-Karabakh war.

In early May 2021, satellite images released by Caucasus Heritage Watch, a watchdog group made up of researchers from Purdue and Cornell, revealed that the local early 19th-century Armenian cemetery had been destroyed by Azerbaijani forces. Bulldozer tracks near the vicinity of the village's Holy Savior Church, founded in 1846, indicated that that building was also endangered.

Satellite photography from July 2021 revealed the centre of the town and a large portion of the town's buildings have been bulldozed for the construction of the Fizuli–Shusha highway. They also revealed the destruction of the statue of Sergei Khudyakov that had stood outside his house-museum.

In August 2021, satellite images released by Caucasus Heritage Watch, revealed that the village's Makun Bridge, which was built in 1890, had been destroyed by Azerbaijan between April 8 and July 7, in the course of river engineering and road construction.

== Historical heritage sites ==
Historical heritage sites in and around Mets Taghlar include the cave of Shmanek (Armenian: Շմանեք), a village from between the 9th and 13th centuries, a 12th/13th-century khachkar, a cemetery from between the 17th and 19th centuries, a bridge built in 1835, and the Holy Savior Church (Armenian: Սուրբ Ամենափրկիչ Եկեղեցի, romanized: Surb Amenaprkich Yekeghetsi) built in 1846. The Taghlar Cave is located in the southern part of the village.

== Demographics ==
In 1886, Mets Taghlar had a population of 2,996, including 1,651 men and 1,345 women, all of them Armenians in 515 households. In 1897, the village had a population of 2,849 consisting of 1,433 men and 1,416 women, all Armenian Apostolic. The village had 3,175 and 3,500 mainly Armenian residents in 1908 and 1914, respectively. The village had 1,503 inhabitants in 2005, and 1,509 inhabitants in 2015.

== Gallery ==
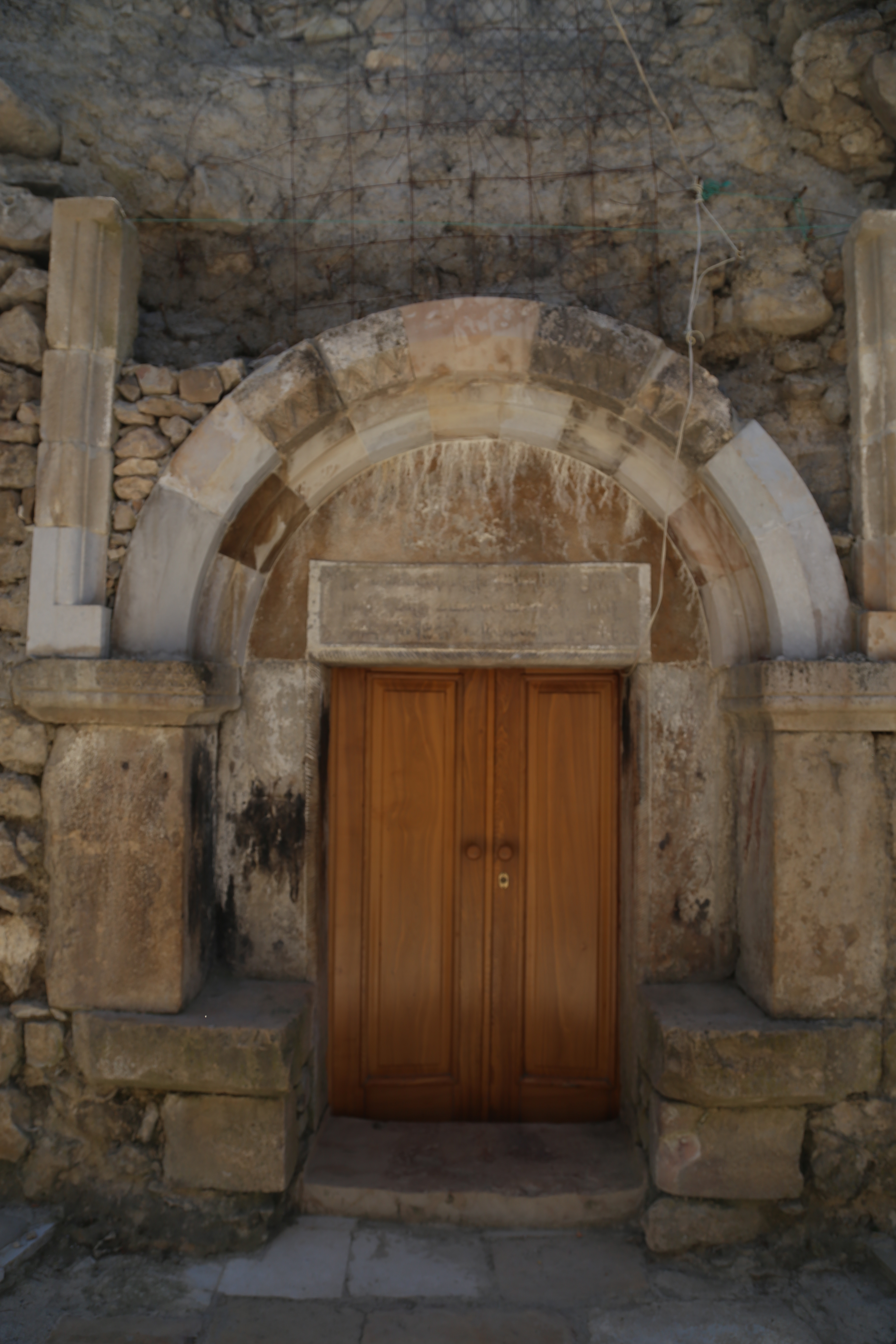
Entrance to the Holy Savior Church, built in 1846

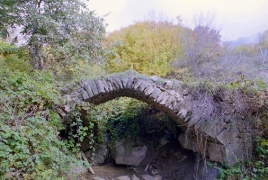
Makun Bridge built in 1890

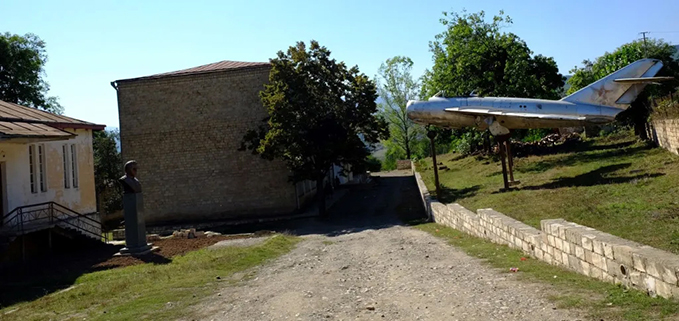
Bust of Sergei Khudyakov with MiG-17

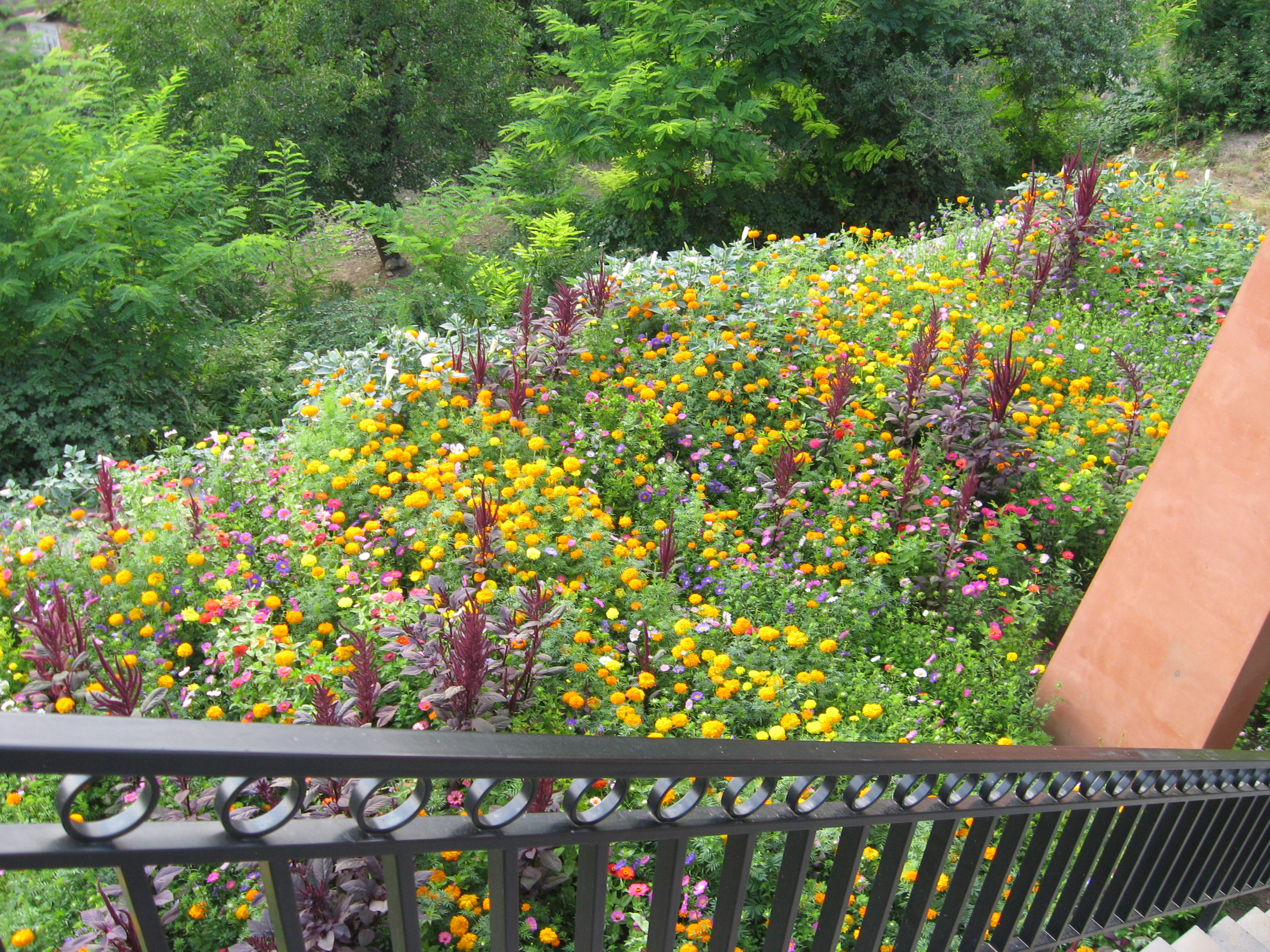
Garden

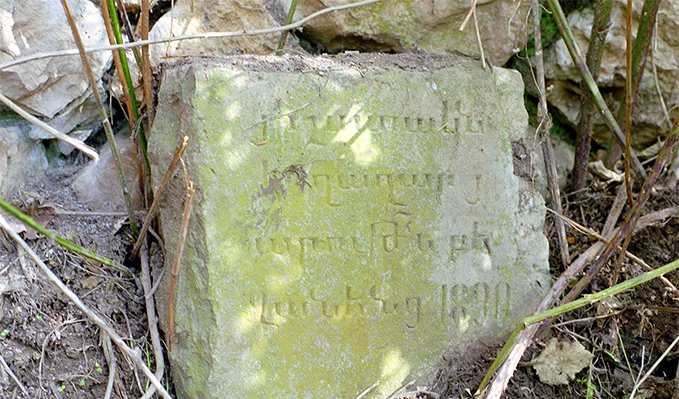
Makun Bridge stone with construction inscription

== Notable people ==
- Sergei Khudyakov, Soviet Armenian Marshal of Aviation
