= Azykh =

Azykh / Azokh Azıx / Ազոխ

- Location within Azerbaijan Location within Karabakh Economic Region
- Coordinates: 39°37′14″N 46°58′42″E
- Country: Azerbaijan
- District: Khojavend
- Elevation: 686 m (2,251 ft)

Population (2015)
  - Total: 741
- Time zone: UTC+4 (AZT)

Azykh (Azerbaijani: Azıx) or Azokh (Armenian: Ազոխ) is a village in the Khojavend District of Azerbaijan, in the region of Nagorno-Karabakh. The village is situated on the river of Ishkhanchay (Azerbaijani: İşxançay) or Ishkhanaget (Armenian: Իշխանագետ), near the Azykh Cave. The village had an ethnic Armenian-majority population prior to the 2020 Nagorno-Karabakh war, and also had an Armenian majority in 1989. The village was part of the Hadrut Province of the breakaway Republic of Artsakh between 1992 and 2020.

== Etymology ==
According to the "Encyclopedic Dictionary of Azerbaijani Toponyms", the name Azykh originates from Old Turkic, meaning "bear den". According to the book "Historical-Architectural Monuments of Nagorno-Karabakh" by Shahen Mkrtchyan, the name Azokh originates from the Armenian word Ազոխ, Azokh, meaning "unripe grapes".

== History ==
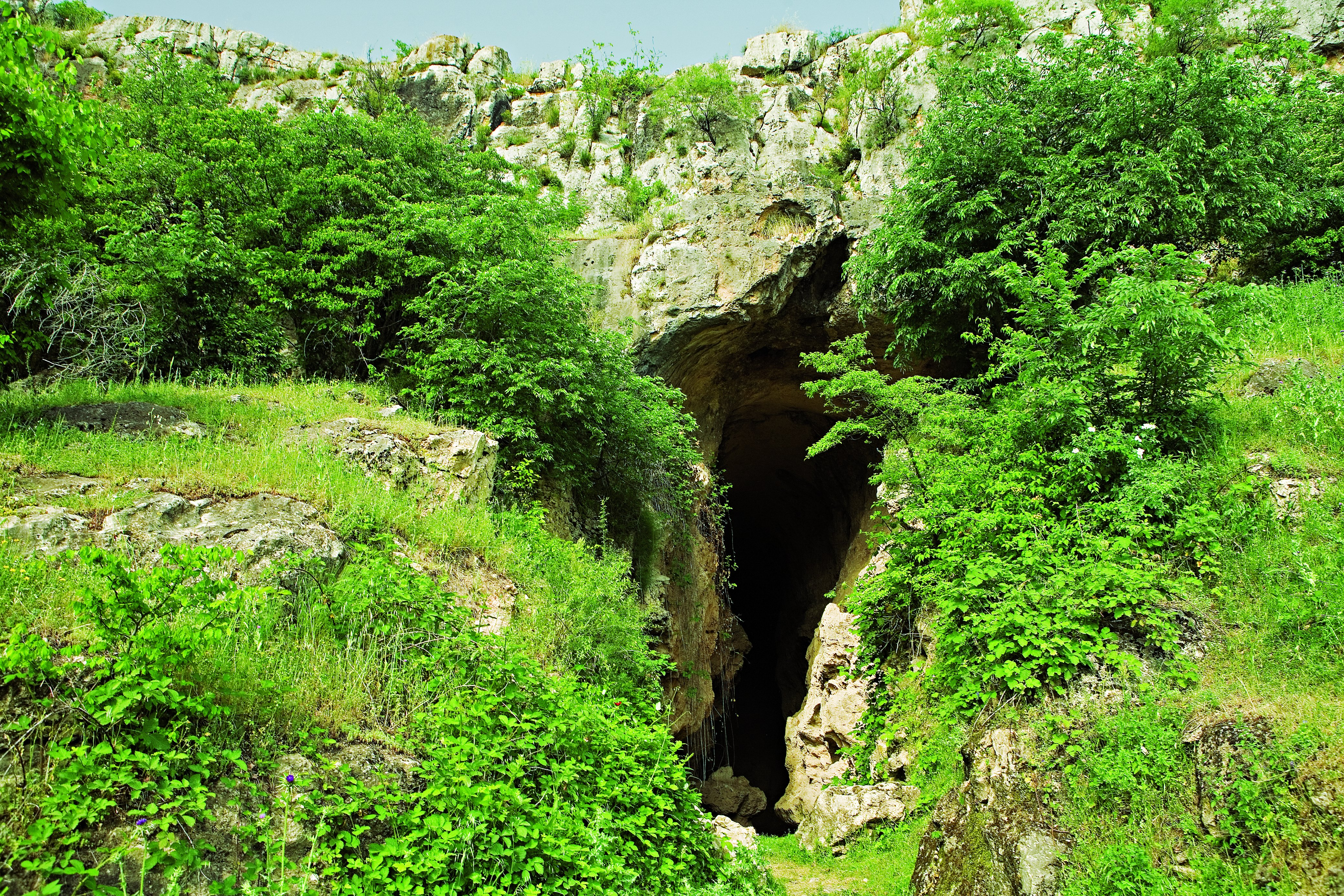
Entrance to the Azykh Cave

The Azykh Cave, located near the village, is a six-cave complex, known as a habitation site of prehistoric humans. The ancient layers of the Middle Paleolithic have yielded Neanderthal fossil remains that may date from around 300,000 years ago.

During the Soviet period, the village was part of the Hadrut District of the Nagorno-Karabakh Autonomous Oblast within the Azerbaijan Soviet Socialist Republic. After the First Nagorno-Karabakh War, the village was administrated as part of the Hadrut Province of the Republic of Artsakh.

The village came under the control of Azerbaijan on 9 November 2020, during the 2020 Nagorno-Karabakh war. Subsequently, The Guardian and Der Spiegel reported that Azerbaijani forces committed a war crime by decapitating Yuri Asryan, an 82-year-old Armenian man who remained in Azokh despite the Azerbaijani offensive towards the village.

== Historical heritage sites ==
Azykh contains a number of historical heritage sites, two of which are registered by the Republic of Artsakh as immovable cultural heritage sites. The registered sites are the Azykh Cave, dating back to the Stone Age, located 700 m to the southeast, as well as the 13th-century bridge of Tsiltakhach (Armenian: Ծիլտախաչ), located 1 km to the southeast. In addition, the village contains the 17th-century church of Surb Astvatsatsin (Armenian: Սուրբ Աստվածածին, lit. 'Holy Mother of God') - a 14 m-long (46 ft) and 8 m-wide (26 ft) stone building built on two arches, and a historical cemetery dating from between the 10th and 19th centuries. Amarkhatun Monastery, Tsitskar Fortress, and Melik Sagam's battlement are also located near the village.
