= Zerti =

- Location within Azerbaijan Location within East Zangezur Economic Region
- Coordinates: 39°40′32″N 46°32′24″E
- Country: Azerbaijan
- District: Lachin
- Time zone: UTC+4 (AZT)
  - Summer (DST): UTC+5 (AZT)

Zerti is a village in the Lachin District of Azerbaijan. It is known locally for its sheep skin production.
