= Böyük Dəhnə =

- Municipality
- Location within Azerbaijan Location within Shaki-Zagatala Economic Region
- Coordinates: 40°58′30″N 47°06′55″E
- Country: Azerbaijan
- Rayon: Shaki

Population
  - Total: 5,255
- Time zone: UTC+4 (AZT)
  - Summer (DST): UTC+5 (AZT)

Böyük Dəhnə (also, Bëyuk Dakhna, Beyuk-Degne, Beyuk-Dekhna, Beyyuk-Dakhna, and Byuyuk-Dakhne) is a village and municipality in the Shaki Rayon of Azerbaijan. It has a population of 5,255.

In 1902 some ancient artifacts, including the 1st or 2nd-century stone with Greek inscription were found here. The square stone, being 145 cm long and 50 cm wide, reads: "Of blessed memory of benevolent Eunon, Aelius Iason". The evidence was first published in 1904.
