= Mammadali Huseynov =

Azerbaijani archaeologist

Məmmədəli Hüseynov
- Born: 3 April 1922; Gazakh Rayon, Azerbaijan SSR
- Died: 5 July 1994 (aged 72)
- Scientific career
- Fields: Ethnography
- Workplaces: National Academy of Sciences of the Azerbaijan SSR

Mammadali Murad Oglu Huseynov (Azerbaijani: Məmmədəli Murad oğlu Hüseynov) was an Azerbaijani and Soviet archaeologist. In 1960, Huseynov carried out excavations in the valleys of the Quruchay and Kondalanchay Rivers, in Nagorno-Karabakh Autonomous Oblast of the Azerbaijan SSR. There, he discovered a fragment of the lower jaw of Homo erectus or Azykhantrop in multi-layer sites of the Paleolithic epoch in Azykh and Tağlar Cave.

== Biography ==
Mammadali Murad Oglu Huseynov was born on 3 April 1922, in the Azerbaijan Soviet Socialist Republic, Qazakh District. After receiving his primary education, Huseynov graduated from the Faculty of History of the Azerbaijan State University in 1951. He then worked as a junior research worker at the Museum of History of Azerbaijan. In 1960, he successfully defended his PhD thesis, "Paleolithic Cave Dwellings on Aveydag Mountain" in Tiflis. From 1971 to 1994, he led a Stone Age department at the Institute of Archaeology and Ethnography of Azerbaijan National Academy of Sciences. He served as the chairman of the Archaeology and Ethnography Department of Azerbaijan State University from 1976 to 1993. In the 1980s, he took the initiative to create a museum-office of Archaeology and Ethnography at the Academy. In 1987 he received the title of Professor. Huseynov died on 5 July 1994, at the age of 72 years.

== Scientific activity ==
Mammadali Murad oglu Huseynov wrote six books and 100 research works. He is considered to be the founder of Paleolithic Age studies in Azerbaijani schools. In 1960, Huseynov carried out excavations in the valleys of the Quruchay and Kondalanchay Rivers, and in Nagorno-Karabakh Autonomous Oblast of the Azerbaijan SSR. He found multilayer sites from the Paleolithic epoch in Azykh (where he found a fragment of the lower jaw of Homo erectus or Azykhantrop) and Taglar Cave. The discovery of Quruchay culture in Karabakh by Huseynov and his colleagues and also the monument of Azikh cave, as well as ancient Palaeolithic monuments that were found in Kazakh, Nakhichevan, Lerik and other regions of the country proved that Azerbaijan was a territory of initial occupation. Although Quruchay culture was thought to date back to 1.5 million years ago, Huseynov, who discovered it, dated its formation to between 1.7 – 2.1 million years ago.

The cultural materials discovered in the caves of Azokh and Taglar (Karabagh), Damjili and Dashsalahli (on the Aveydagh mountain, the region of Kazakh, Zara, Kalbajar), Gazma (Nakhichevan) and Buzeir (Lerik) provide rich and varied evidence about the ancient peoples who settled in the territories of Azerbaijan during the Palaeolithic Age. Azikh cave played an important and special role among the monuments of the Palaeolithic period in Azerbaijan. As a result of the investigations, six huge halls and numerous archaeological materials, laid in 10 cultural stratums, were revealed. These belonged to the Lower Palaeolithic – the stages of shel, ashel as well as the Middle Palaeolithic period. Stone tools of were discovered that provided information about the settlers and their livestock on the shores of the Quruchay river. The most essential scientific discovery of the Azikh cave is considered to be a piece of jaw with two teeth, which was found in 1968, in the 5th stratum. The scientific investigations that were carried out with modern methods and technical equipment of the last quarter of the 20th century proved that this jaw belonged to an 18–22-year-old woman, who lived 350–400 thousand years ago, during the Middle Ashel Age of the Lower Palaeolithic Period. This discovery was the oldest item found in the territory of the USSR. The jaw was named "Azikhantrop" ("human from Azikh") and proved that the territory of Azerbaijan is one of the ancient settled territories of the world.

== Books ==
- Archeology of Azerbaijan (The Stone Age), (1975)
- Ancient Paleolithic of Azerbaijan: Qarachay Culture and its Development Stages: 1,500,000–70,000 Ago. (1985)
- Paleolithic of Azerbaijan (in co-authorship with A.K.Jafarov), (1986)
- Zardabli, Ismail bey (2014). The History of Azerbaijan: From Ancient Times to the Present Day. LULU PRESS INC. p. 14. ISBN 978-1291971316.

== See also ==
- History of Azerbaijan
- Ishag Jafarzadeh
