= Büzeyir =

- Municipality
- Location within Azerbaijan
- Coordinates: 38°43′43″N 48°23′52″E
- Country: Azerbaijan
- Rayon: Lerik

Population
  - Total: 420
- Time zone: UTC+4 (AZT)
  - Summer (DST): UTC+5 (AZT)

Büzeyir is a village and municipality in the Lerik Rayon of Azerbaijan. It has a population of 420.
