= Farhad Guliyev =

Azerbaijani archaeologist (born 1973)

- Azerbaijani: Fərhad Eldar oğlu Quliyev
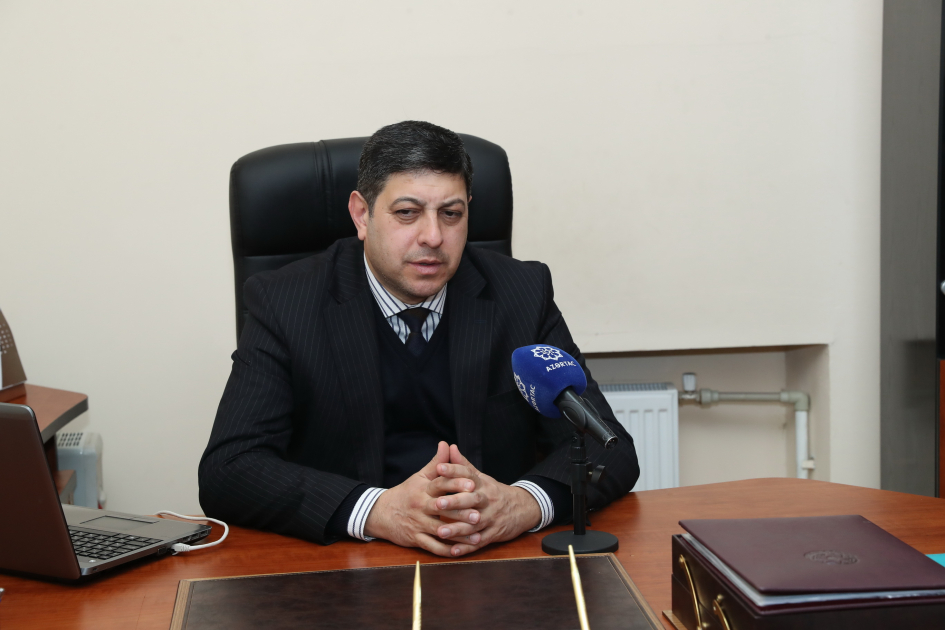
- Born: October 14, 1973 (age 53); Baku, Azerbaijan
- Citizenship: Soviet Union; Azerbaijan
- Education: Baku State University; Azerbaijan State University
- Known for: archaeologist
- Children: 2
- Scientific career
- Fields: Archaeology
- Workplaces: Institute of Archaeology and Anthropology of ANAS (director)
- Thesis: "Horse Breeding in Ancient Azerbaijan" (2003)

External videos
- Farhad Guliyev: There is a need for the existence and activity of archaeological science in Azerbaijani society.

Farhad Guliyev (Azerbaijani: Fərhad Eldar oğlu Quliyev; 14 October 1973) is an Azerbaijani archaeologist, Doctor of Philosophy in History, Associate Professor. Director of the Institute of Archaeology and Anthropology of ANAS (since February 22, 2024), Corresponding Member of the German Archaeological Institute.

== Life ==
Guliyev was born on October 14, 1973 in Baku, and graduated from secondary school No. 18. While entering the evening department of the History Faculty of Baku State University, he was accepted as a laboratory assistant at the Institute of Archaeology and Ethnography of ANAS (Archaeology and Ethnography sector of the Institute of History of the Academy of Sciences).

From 1990 to 1996, while continuing his studies at a higher educational institution, Guliyev took part in archaeological research conducted in various regions of the country, after graduating from higher education in 1996; he began to fully engage in scientific activities.

In 2003, at the Dissertation Council of the Institute of Archaeology and Ethnography, Guliyev defended his thesis on "Horse Breeding in Ancient Azerbaijan" with a degree in archaeology and in 2004 was awarded the degree of candidate of historical sciences, and in 2023 the Higher Attestation Commission awarded the academic title of Associate Professor. In 2006, he was elected as the head of the "Scientific Exposition Department" (Museum of Archaeology and Ethnography) of the Institute of Archaeology and Ethnography of ANAS, in 2007-2020, he headed the International Archaeological Expedition of the Institute working in the Tovuz region, and in 2006-2013, he was the chairman of the "Young Scientists Council" of the Institute.

In June 2023, by the decision of the Presidium of ANAS, Guliyev was appointed Acting Director of the Institute of Archaeology, Ethnography and Anthropology. On February 21, 2024, he was elected as the Director of the Institute of Archaeology and Anthropology at the general meeting of the Department of Social Sciences of ANAS and on February 22, by the decision of the Presidium of ANAS, he was endorsed as the Director of the Institute of Archaeology and Anthropology.

== Scientific career ==
Farhad Guliyev is an archaeologist, who has been active for more than 30 years, conducts research on the problems of the archaeological cultures of the most ancient period of Azerbaijan, the system of Near Eastern and Anatolian civilizations.

Since the beginning of construction work in the liberated territories in 2022, Guliyev has conducted excavations in the archaeological monuments of the region, and has turned the monument into an international research object to study the museum-mausoleum of Molla Panah Vagif in Shusha and reintroduce the ancient settlement of "Üzerliktepe" dating back to the 2nd millennium BC to the world scientific community.

For the past twenty years, Guliyev has led an international expedition in the Ganja-Gazakh region, bringing together specialists from the University of Tokyo in Japan and the National Center for Scientific Research in France, working with Azerbaijani archaeologists.

In 2024 Farhad Guliyev was elected a corresponding member of the German Archaeological Institute, as the first Azerbaijani archaeologist.

== Award ==
- In 2017, he was awarded the "Scientist of the Year 2016" award within the framework of the "Most Deserving Scientist - A.L.A." grant competition of the Science Development Foundation under the President of the Republic of Azerbaijan.
