= Taghlar Cave =

Cave and archaeological site in Azerbaijan

- Tağlar mağarası Մեծ Թաղերի Քարայր; Mets Tagheri Karayr
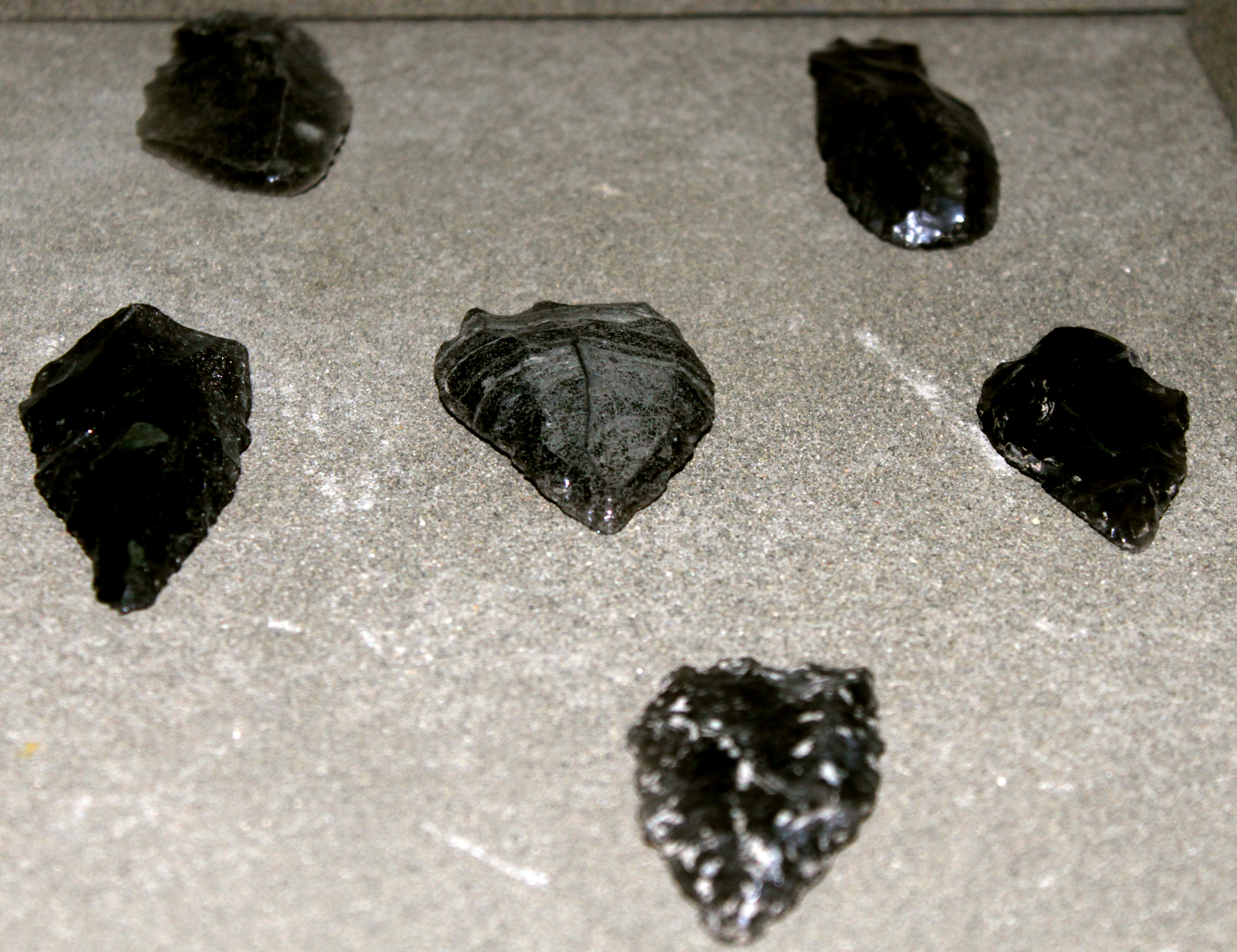
- Flintstone tools found in the cave

- location in Azerbaijan Taghlar Cave (Karabakh Economic Region)
- 39°36′17″N 46°57′53″E
- Periods: Stone Age, Bronze, Copper Age
- Location: Boyuk Taghlar (Mets Tagher), Azerbaijan

Site notes
- Excavation dates: 1963
- Archaeologists: M. M. Huseynov

The Taghlar cave (Azerbaijani: Tağlar mağarası; Armenian: Մեծ Թաղերի Քարայր, romanized: Mets Tagheri Karayr) is an archaeological site that was inhabited by prehistoric humans of the Mousterian culture during the Paleolithic. The cave is located in Azerbaijan, in the disputed region of Nagorno-Karabakh, in the southern part of Boyuk Taghlar (Mets Tagher) village, on the left banks of the Guruchay River.

Ancient people lived here 64-24 thousand years ago.

== History ==
The cave was discovered during the Paleolithic archaeological expedition of Academy of Science of Azerbaijan under the leadership of M.Huseynov in 1960. Excavations in the Taghlar cave can be divided into two stages:

1963-1967, 1973	Intensive researches, as a result, some archaeological layers found in 9 meters depth.
1972-1982, 1986	More complex researches

Vahid Hajiyev and Mammadali Huseynov gave the first information about the stratigraphy of the cave as a result of 1963-1964 excavations. R. Sultanova published an article on the geological features of the cave in 1973.

Cleansing of the existing sections was carried out to study stratigraphy and lithology of sediments and the occurrence of cultural residues in 1976-1982.

Bone remains of animals found starting from the first year of excavations in the cave, and they were carefully classified in 1977-78.

Within the framework of the International INTAS-2000 program, European scholars including Professor Henri de Lumley conducted scientific research of archaeological, paleontological and paleoanthropological findings of multilayer Taglar and other Paleolithic caves in Azerbaijan in September–October 2002.

Material and cultural artefacts found at the Taglar cave were exhibited in 1981 in Musée de l'Homme in Paris.

== Findings ==
Beginning in 1963, archaeological excavations were carried out in the cave and more than 7,000 stone tools and over 2,000 faunal fossilized bones were discovered and six cultural sediment layers were identified at the site. Pottery shards of the Middle Ages, the Bronze Age and Copper Age were found right underneath the top layer. Indices of the Mousterian culture were found in between the 2nd and 6th layer. Numerous work-pieces of tool making, red, black, brown, grey, white and other colours have also been discovered in the inventory of the cave.

The remains of large mammals such as horse, noble deer, bull were found in the 5th layer. From the 5th layer, remains of bones of small mammals (Rodentia) were also released in 1977 by M.B.Suleymanov. This collection was investigated by A.K.Markova in the 1980s and in 2009. The collection includes fragments of the lower and upper jaws of rodents with molars and incisors, as well as individual samples of incisors and molars. Those bone residues belong to six species: Microtus (Microtus) obscurus, Ellobius lutescens, Cricetulus migratorius, Arvicola terrestris, Meriones libycus and Allactaga williamsi. Based on the ecological features of fauna relics of the cave, it is assumed that arid-steppe and semi-desert landscapes dominated around Taghlar cave during the period of ancient people lived here. There were also detected pieces of some species of rodents which are not believed that they have inhabited in this cave.

== Classification ==
Only the largest cavity of the cave with an area of 120 square meters belongs to the Pleistocene era. Other parts are linked to the Mousterian period.

The first layer belongs to the late Holocene while the rest belong to late Pleistocene.

== Literature ==
- Azərbaycan Tarixi (7 cilddə). Bakı: Elm, 1998, 1-ci cild
- А. К. Джафаров. Мустьерская культура Азербайджана: по материалам Тагларской пещеры. — «Элм», 1983. — 96 с.
