= Institute of Archaeology and Anthropology (Azerbaijan) =

Azerbaijani scientific research institute

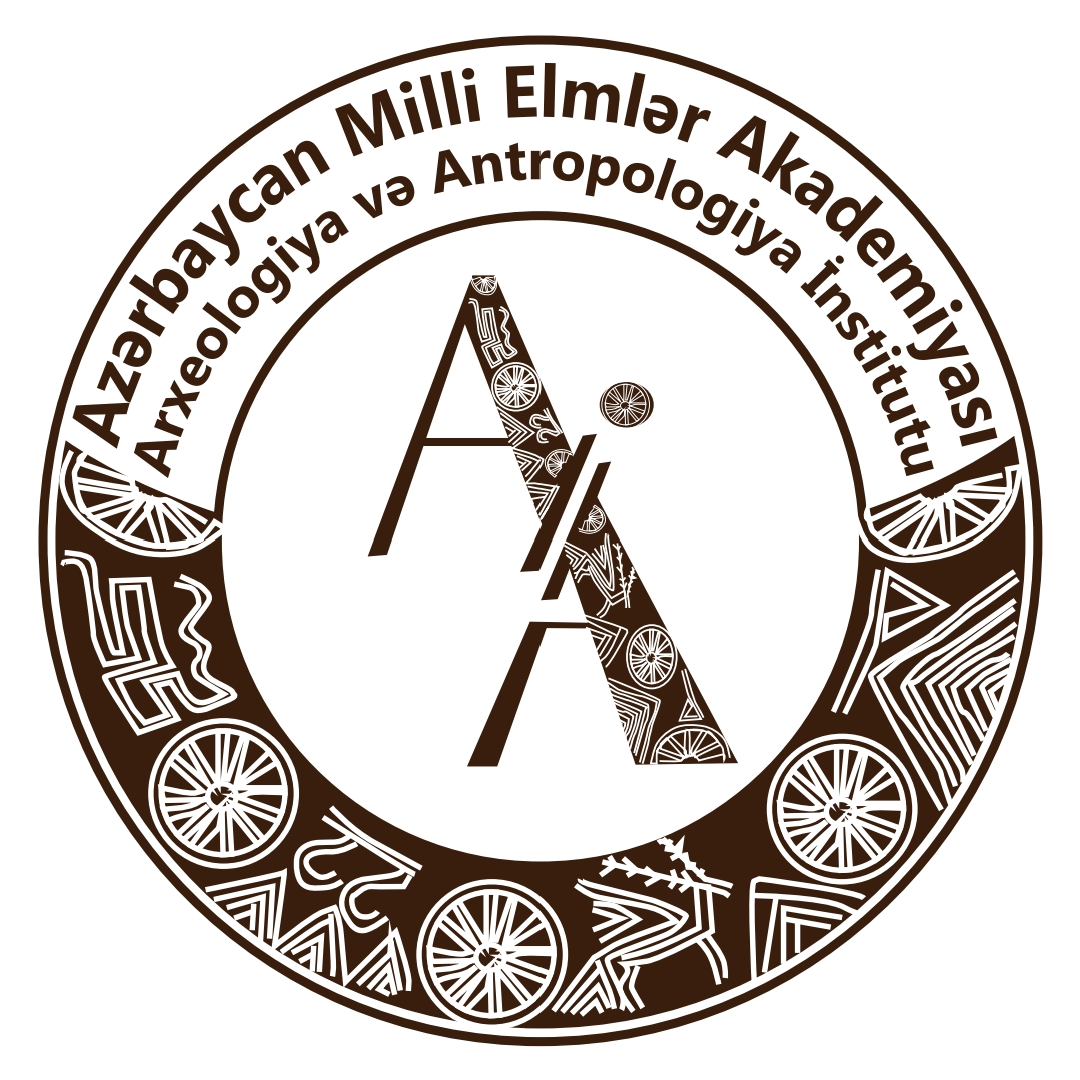
- Established: 1993
- Head: Farhad Guliyev
- Address: 115 H. Javid Avenue
- Location: Baku, Azerbaijan
- Website: https://arxeologiya.az/en/home/

The Institute of Archaeology and Anthropology is a scientific research institution in Baku, Azerbaijan. It operates under the Azerbaijan National Academy of Sciences (ANAS) and conducts research in archaeology and anthropology, with a focus on the material and cultural heritage of Azerbaijan.

The Institute comprises several specialized departments covering different historical periods and research fields, including prehistoric archaeology, bioarchaeology and social anthropology, forensic archaeology, etc.

Since February 22, 2024, the institute has been headed by Farhad Eldar oglu Guliyev, a historian and archaeologist.

== History ==
The organization of archaeological research in Azerbaijan began in 1923 with the establishment of the Azerbaijan Research Society, which contributed to the development of early archaeological and ethnographic studies. In 1924, the Azerbaijan Archaeological Committee was created to organize expeditions and register historical monuments. During the 20th century, archaeological research was conducted within various institutional frameworks, including the Azerbaijan Scientific Research Institute and the Institute of History under the Azerbaijan National Academy of Sciences.

In 1993, an independent Institute of Archaeology and Ethnography was established by presidential order, separating it from the Archaeology and Ethnography sector of the Institute of History. In 2021, it was renamed the Institute of Archaeology, Ethnography and Anthropology. On 19 January 2024, the Cabinet of Ministers of the Republic of Azerbaijan officially renamed the institution the Institute of Archaeology and Anthropology.

== Mission and Activities ==
The institute conducts research in the fields of archaeology and anthropology, focusing on the study of Azerbaijan's cultural and material heritage. Its activities include archaeological excavations, anthropological research, documentation of cultural heritage, and the publication of scientific works.

The institute also participates in monitoring archaeological sites, provides scientific opinions for heritage protection, organizes field expeditions, and collaborates with foreign research centers.

== Departments ==
- Stone Age Archaeology
- Neolithic and Chalcolithic Archaeology
- Middle and Late Bronze Age Archaeology
- Iron Age Archaeology
- Classical Antiquity and Caucasian Albanian Archaeology
- Early Medieval Archaeology
- Islamic Archaeology
- Ethnoarchaeology
- Forensic Archaeology
- Caspian Underwater Archaeology
- Numismatics and Epigraphy
- Anthropology
- History and Theory of Archaeological Heritage
- Archaeological Investigation of New Construction Areas
- Monitoring and Evaluation of Archaeological Fieldwork
- Scientific Exhibition Design
- Archaeological Technology and Survey-Design

== Laboratory ==
- Physical Anthropology (Bioarchaeology)
- Traceology and Experimental Archaeology Laboratory

== Publications ==
The Institute publishes monographs, collective volumes, and academic articles. It also issues the peer-reviewed journal Tempus Pontem: Azerbaijan Journal of Archaeology and Anthropology (TP: AJAA), which publishes research in archaeology and anthropology. The journal includes articles in English and covers various subfields, including aerial archaeology, bioarchaeology, numismatics, etc.

== Expeditions ==
The Institute organizes archaeological and anthropological expeditions in different regions of Azerbaijan, including recently liberated areas of Karabakh. It has also participated in joint research projects with academic institutions from countries including Turkey, Kazakhstan, Japan, Korea, Italy, and Germany.

== Archaeological discoveries ==
In 2008, the archaeologists headed by Farhad Guliyev, and the Japanese archaeologists from the University of Tokyo led by Yoshihiro Nishiaki explored the Neolithic site Goytepe archaeological complex. Since 2008, eight radiocarbon analyses (in French and Japanese laboratories) of coal residues taken from different squares of the excavation area have been carried out. Archaeologists revealed clay bins and ovens/hearths mainly in the courtyard of the settlement close to the wing walls or circular constructions in the archaeological site. The bins with a diameter of 50–60 cm had a round or oval form with a height of 50 cm. The bottom of the bins was dug nearly 10–15 cm into the ground. During the excavations some of them discovered empty, while others were found with different tools and materials showing that they also had a storage function. The ovens with a diameter around 60–70 cm had also a round or oval shape, nevertheless, their bottoms were covered with river cobbles and enclosed by a clay rim.

In 2012–2013, the French-Azerbaijani joint archaeological expedition (named Nabialla) explored the necropolis and burial traditions belong to the Bronze-Iron Age in Lenkaran and Lerik provinces. 10 megalithic structures with a burial mound containing glass, red jasper, carnelian were discovered. A small tripod bowl, around 35 pottery sherds made of orange baked clay were also among the findings.

In 2021, more than 200 stone box graves dating to the Khojali-Gadabay culture of the Late Bronze–Early Iron Age in Azerbaijan were uncovered during the rescue excavations in Çovdar, Dashkasan. Archaeologists identified a burial custom in which males were buried on their right side and females on their left. Some individuals showed signs of physical illnesses, including dental pathologies, and a trepanned skull was also discovered. Weapons, head ornaments, ceramic products, and a horse burial were among the notable finds.

In July 2024, discovery of the 3.500 year-old dining room with lots of ceramic remains was announced in Tava Tepe in Agstafa by the archaeologists from the University of Catania and the National Academy of Sciences of Azerbaijan. The structure features an entrance supported by wooden columns and topped with a thatched roof, which probably extended over the entire complex. The circular structure, marked by numerous holes, indicates a diameter of around 15 meters. According to the archaeologists, evidence of burning, along with the remains of bowls and glasses made from black burnished ceramics found throughout the excavation area, suggests that the archaeological site was used for food preparation and consumption.

In March 2025, an approximately 8,400-year-old Mesolithic human figurine was discovered in Damjili Cave, western Azerbaijan's Qazax District, by a collaborative Azerbaijani-Japanese team. This small stone artifact, dating to between 6400 and 6100 BC, was carved from river stone. Measuring 51 mm in length and 15 mm in width, the figurine lacks gender-specific features, which contrasts with the predominantly female clay figurines characteristic of the later Neolithic period. Researchers associate the figurine with the early Shomutepe culture.

In July 2025, the team of archaeologists led by Dr. Shamil Najafov discovered a 3,800-year-old kurgan dating to the Middle Bronze Age in the Ceyranchol plain near the village of Yovshanlidere. The burial mound, measuring 28 meters across and 2 meters high, was divided into three symbolic sections: one with the warrior's remains and weapons, another containing ceramic vessels, and a third left empty—possibly intended as a spiritual resting space for the soul. The warrior, believed to have been over two meters tall, was buried in a semi-flexed position holding a four-pronged bronze spearhead. Grave goods included bronze ankle rings, obsidian tools, paste beads, and a dozen decorated ceramic jugs filled with cooked animal bones, including goat, cow, horse, and boar. Atop the mound, archaeologists found 14 limestone slabs, each weighing around one ton, along with a carved bull-shaped idol placed at the kurgan's head.

In July 2025, archaeologists uncovered the foundations of a Bronze Age settlement in the village of Kechelekeran, Yardimli District. The site revealed ancient dwellings built from river stones, alongside fragments of domestic pottery of various shapes and sizes, miniature household items, and bone spindle whorls.

In February 2026, archaeologists reported on a multi-year systematic research program at the Khojaly Archaeological Complex. The investigations focused on a vast Muslim necropolis covering more than two hectares, where 212 medieval graves have been excavated out of an estimated total of over 2,000. These burials, alongside the architectural remains of several mausoleums including one dated to 1356–1357 confirm a continuous Muslim-Turkic presence in the region from the 13th to the 18th centuries. The complex also exhibits significant stratigraphic diversity, featuring Bronze Age kurgans (burial mounds) that indicate the site served as a ceremonial and funerary center since prehistoric times. Researchers noted that the material culture and burial typologies align with broader medieval Islamic patterns in the South Caucasus.

== See also ==
- Archaeology of Azerbaijan
