= Azykh Cave =

Cave and archaeological site in Azerbaijan

- Azokh Cave
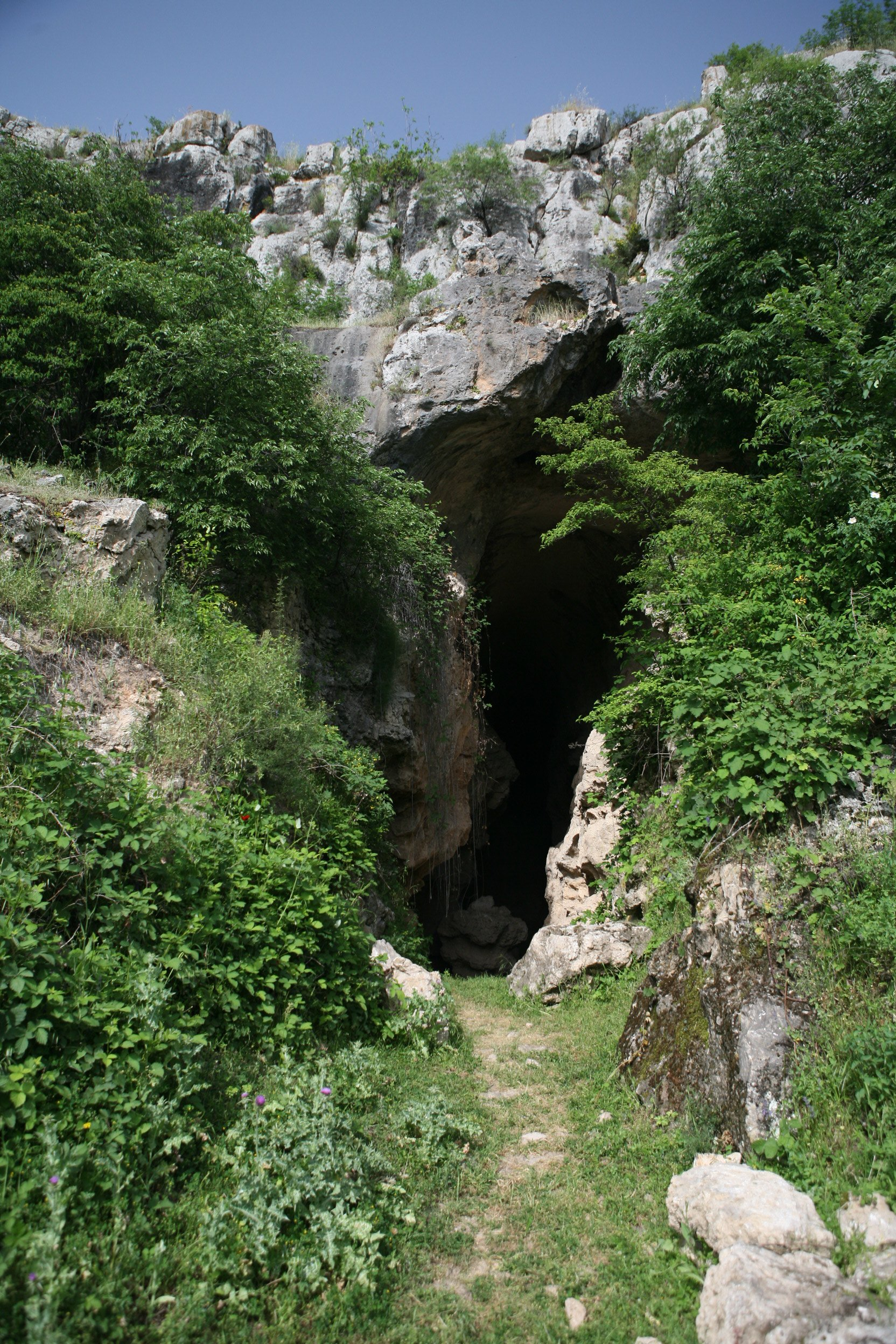
- Entrance to the cave

- Location in Azerbaijan
- 39°37′9.12″N 46°59′18″E
- Type: Archaeological site
- Location: Azykh, Khojavend, Azerbaijan

History
- Built: c. 300,000 years ago
- Abandoned: c. 250,000 years ago

Site notes
- Excavation dates: 1960s, mid 1990s, 2002-2009
- Archaeologists: Mammadali Huseynov, Tania King
- Discovered: 1960

Azykh Cave (Azerbaijani: Azıx mağarası), also referred to as Azokh Cave (Armenian: Ազոխի քարանձավ, romanized: Azoxi k’aranjav), is a six-cave complex in Azerbaijan, known as a habitation site of prehistoric humans. It is situated near the village of Azykh in the Khojavend District. The cave is an important prehistoric site which has been occupied by different human groups over time. The ancient layers of the Middle Paleolithic have yielded Neanderthal fossil remains that may date from around 300,000 years ago.

== Discovery ==
The cave was discovered in 1960 by the Azerbaijan National Academy of Sciences (ANAS) under the leadership of Mammadali Huseynov and is considered to be the site of one of the most ancient locations of proto-human presence in Eurasia. A Neanderthal-like jaw bone found in 1968 is assumed to be around 250,000 years old and thus one of the oldest proto-human remains found in the Caucasus. Its discovery gave rise to the term Azykh Man. Archaeologists have suggested that the finds from the lowest layers are of a pre-Acheulean culture (730,000 to 1,800,000 years ago), that resembles the Olduwan culture named after Tanzania's Olduvai Gorge in many respects.

The poor quality of the 1960s excavation, in which no taphonomic data was collected, led to uncertainties over the chronological sequence of the layers. Excavations resumed in the mid-1990s. In 2002, an international research team headed by Tania King discovered undisturbed entrances to the cave as well as fauna and stone tools. Fossil assemblages recovered from the excavations between 2002 and 2009 found Pleistocene-era remains of bears accumulated as a result of hibernation, but no evidence for simultaneous occupation of the cave by bears and hominins. Other faunal remains, mainly herbivores, had been brought to the cave by hominins, but butchering had taken place somewhere else, not at the rear of the cave where the remains were found. When cave sediments reached close to the cave roof, the cave ceased to be used by hominins. During the Holocene, the upper sediments were eroded by water, opening up the cave to renewed human use.

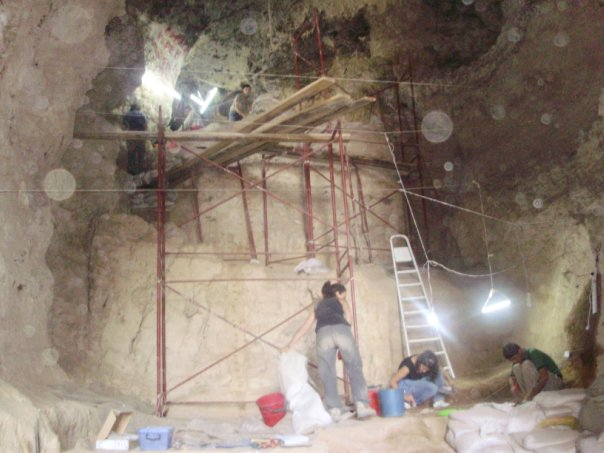
Excavations in 2009

The cave is considered to have housed some of the earliest groups of proto-humans in Eurasia. Using uranium isotopes as a speleothem dating method, the formation of the cave and thus the earliest hominid deposits have been dated to 1.19 ±0.08 million years ago.

On 24 November 2020, archeological finds in the cave were brought to Baku by the representatives of the Azerbaijani State Security Service and placed in the Archaeological Fund of the Institute of Archeology and Anthropology of ANAS.

== See also ==
- Janapar, a hiking trail that passes by Azykh Cave
