= List of archaeological sites of Azerbaijan =

List of the most important archaeological monuments of Azerbaijan – the list of the most important archaeological monuments approved by the decision number 132 of the Cabinet of the Republic of Azerbaijan dated August 2, 2001 and indicated to be registered in Azerbaijan. The oldest monuments on the list are Azikh and Taghlar caves, located respectively in Fuzuli and Khojavend districts, belonging to the Kuruchay culture period. One of the listed monuments is included in the UNESCO World Heritage List. Four of the listed monuments are cultural, architectural and historical reserves.

== List ==
No.	Monument	Address	Short description	Photo	Coordinates
1	Azykh Cave	Azykh Cave, Fuzuli District	It is located on the southeastern slope of the Lesser Caucasus mountains, in the Kuruchay gorge of Karabakh, on the left bank of the Kuruchay river (3 km away from the river), 200–250 meters below the riverbed of the Kuruchay. It is a cave complex located in the territory of Fuzuli, between the villages of Azykh and Salaketin, 1400 meters above the sea level. The area of Azykh cave is 800 km^{2}. There are 8 corridors with a length of up to 600 meters. Some of the corridors are 20–25 meters high. Azykh cave is famous as a settlement of Stone Age people. The cave was discovered in 1960 by the "Paleolithic Archaeological Expedition" of ANAS under the leadership of Mammadali Huseynov. During the conducted research, ten cultural layers were discovered. It has been discovered that the cave was inhabited during the Kuruchay culture, the Acheulean culture and the Mousterian culture. In June 1968, during the archaeological excavations conducted by the "Paleolithic Archaeological Expedition" under the leadership of Mammadali Huseynov in the IV horizon of the V layer of the Azykh camp, a jaw belonging to a primitive man was discovered along with several stone objects. Professor Damir Hajiyev conducted scientific research for a long time on the jaw belonging to a primitive man found in the layer belonging to the middle Acheulean culture of the multi-layered Azykh Paleolithic camp.	Entrance of Azykh Cave Lower jaw bone of Azikhanthropus, Azerbaijan History Museum	39°37′9.08″N 46°59′18.97″E
2	Taghlar Cave	Boyuk Taghlar, Khojavend District	It is located in the south of Boyuk Taglar village of Khojavand district, on the left bank of the Kuruchay river. The Taglar Paleolithic camp is the only monument in the Caucasus and the Middle East where the long-term development history of labor tools and the features of the emergence of new labor tools can be studied. During the archaeological excavations conducted in the cave between 1963 and 1986, more than 8,000 stone objects and more than 600,000 hunted animal bones were found. For the first time, in June–July 1963, the "Paleolithic Archaeological Expedition" under the leadership of M. Huseynov carried out archaeological excavations in the multi-layered Taglar paleolithic camp. During the initial archaeological excavations in the Taglar camp, 3 cultural layers were recorded in the sediments of the camp.		39°37′06″N 45°57′17″E
3	Damjili Cave	Dash Salahly, Qazax District	It is located in the southeast of Aveydag, under the limestone rock, which stretches from Dash Salahli village of Gazakh district to Khram river. In 1956–1958, the "Paleolithic Archaeological Expedition" under the leadership of M.M. Huseynov conducted archaeological excavations in the Damjili Cave camp. During the archaeological excavations conducted in the Damjili camp under the leadership of M.M. Huseynov, it was determined that the sediment in the cave was mixed, and therefore it was not possible to determine the stratigraphy of the sediment. In the Damjili camp, sedimentary layers of different periods and remains of the material culture were mixed together. During the archeological excavations conducted in Damjili Cave camp, up to 7,000 stone objects and more than 2,000 bones of hunted animals were found. Mousterian and Levallois sharpeners, goshov-type tools, knives, cutting tools, awls and a lot of production waste were recorded in the stoneware found in the Damjili camp. According to the technique and typology of the stone tools discovered from the Damjili Cave camp, it was possible to say that they were made in the Mousterian, Mesolithic, Upper Paleolithic and Neolithic periods.	Entrance of the Damjili Cave Working tools made of camel's eye and flint found in Damjili Cave	41°8′29″N 45°15′58″E
4	Gazma Cave	Tananam, Sharur District	It is located 3 km north-east of Tananam village of Sharur district, at an altitude of 1450 m above sea level. It was named in this way because it is located in Gazma valley. It was discovered in the summer of 1983 during the exploration of the "Paleolithic Archaeological Expedition" in the Ordubad and Sharur districts of Nakhchivan. During the initial exploratory excavation, 4 cultural layers were recorded in the sediments of Gazma Cave. During the archaeological excavations conducted in layers I and II, clay pots belonging to the Middle Ages, Bronze and Eneolithic periods, and stoneware and hunted animal bones were found in layers III-IV. During the technical and typological study of the stone tools found in 1983 from the excavation cave camp, it was determined that they were made during the Mousterian culture.	Working tools made of camel's eye found in the Gazma Cave, Azerbaijan History Museum	39°30′46″N 45°10′28″E
5	Gobustan State Historical and Cultural Reserve	Gobustan, Garadagh district	It is located in Gobustan settlement of Garadagh district, 56 km away from Baku. Gobustan has long been known to Azerbaijani cattlemen as a wintering place. However, the material-cultural remains and rock paintings there were firstly discovered by one of the famous Azerbaijani archaeologists prof. Ishag Jafarzadeh in 1939–1940. In connection with the Great Patriotic War, which began in 1941, the search was stopped and continued in 1947. I. As a result of difficult scientific search and archeological research carried out by Jafarzadeh over the years, more than 3500 images of people and animals and various inscriptions - petroglyphs, drawn on 750 rocks by tattooing, drilling and rubbing methods, and 20 rock shelters were discovered. After that, as a result of search and archaeological excavations conducted by J. Rustamov and F. Muradova under the leadership of Jafarzadeh, many paintings, settlements and material and cultural remains were discovered. Two sub-layers of the three cultural layers discovered in the "Ana Zaga" settlement on the Boyukdash mountain belong directly to the Stone Age. The Gobustan monument is also interesting because human life here continued uninterruptedly from the tenth millennium BC until the 18th century. Taking into account the exceptional importance of the complex of material cultural remains found in Gobustan for history and culture, the Council of Ministers of the Azerbaijan Soviet Socialist Republic declared Gobustan as a state historical-artistic reserve based on the decision dated September 9, 1966. The reserve mainly covers a large area where three mountains (Boyukdash, Kichikdash and Cingirdag) are located.	Entrance of the Gobustan State Historical and Cultural Reserve A rock depicting a Yalli scene A rock depicting a Yalli and sunny boat scene Chopping tools, Ana Zaga Cave, Boyukdash mountain, Gobustan Museum	40°7′30″N 49°22′30″E
6	Alikomektepe	Uchtepe, Jalilabad District	It is located on the right bank of Incechay, near the village of Uchtepe of Jalilabad district. The place was excavated in 600 square meters area which belongs to the Eneolithic period. The thickness of the cultural layer is 5.1 m. During the excavation, it was determined that there are six construction layers. The walls in the lower building layers were built from a series of clay bricks and reinforced with plasters. The buildings on the upper floors of the settlement were square-shaped and built with one or two rows of clay bricks. Outbuildings, or auxiliary buildings, were connected to the houses and connected by a special passage. The diameter of the round-shaped excavation-type building found on the third construction floor of the settlement was about 3 m. Its walls were whitewashed with lime and decorated with geometrical ornament with red ocher. Ornamental motifs consist of contiguous circle, horseshoe pattern, parallel lines and dots. It is believed that this building was built for the purpose of worship. Remains of potter's balls were found in all construction layers of the settlement. As a result of archaeological research, two types of domesticated horse bones were discovered in Alikomektepe, which is a great innovation in terms of providing the oldest history of horse domestication not only in the Caucasus, but also in the whole Eurasia.	Bronze-copper cauldron discovered from Alikomektepe settlement, Azerbaijan History Museum	39°20′13″N 48°25′19″E
7	Chalagantepe	Afatly, Aghdam District	It is a settlement belonging to the Eneolithic period located in the territory of Afatly village of Aghdam district. Excavation was carried out in 315 sq.m. The thickness of the cultural layer is 4.3 m. The buildings discovered during the excavation were circular in shape and were built from a row of mud bricks. One of the buildings (No. 26) was divided into two parts by a partition wall. A passage connecting one part of the house with another is placed in the partition wall. A mat was found on the clay floor, and the remains of twice-whitened plaster were found on the inside of the wall. The whitewashed walls were patterned with red paint. Semicircular and circular marks remained from these patterns. Probably, this building was used as a shrine. During the research, various labor tools were discovered, including bone toxa, flint, and polishing tools. The ceramics of Chalagantepe was made of clay with plant mixture, baked in red color and polished. Many of the vessels were decorated with carved ornaments and covered with dark red paint. Some bowls were patterned in dark brown with nested squares. The part of one of the bowls from the throat to the body protrudes inwards. It was determined that the remains of ocher and mats were found in the skeletons of the children's graves discovered in Chalagantepe. Stone, bone, turquoise and copper beads, mother-of-pearl ornaments were also found in the graves. After the radiocarbon analysis of the remains of wheat found in the place of settlement, it was determined that the Chalgantepe monument belongs to the first half of the 5th millennium BC. The oldest exhibits of the Aghdam Bread Museum, which was opened in Agdam district in 1983, were the remains of wheat found in Chalagantepe.	Human skull with traces of trepanation discovered from Chalagantepe settlement, Azerbaijan History Museum	40°1′29″N 47°6′43″E
8	Leyla-Tepe	Guzanly, Aghdam District	It is a settlement belonging to the Eneolithic period located in the Guzanly settlement of Aghdam district. The surface materials of the monument are divided into two groups. The first group was made of clay with a mixture of sand, with hand, rather rough. Traces of a comb-like tool were preserved on some of them, and the edges of some of them were decorated with scratches. The second group of ceramics was made of clay with a mixture of plants and baked in red color, sometimes covered with green engobe and decorated with black color. Greenish ceramics are similar to Ubaid ceramics. The quadrangular buildings discovered during the excavation were divided into several parts by partitions. On the remains of this building, it was determined that there are remains of circular pottery spheres with a diameter of 1 m. Some of the earring-type vessels were made on the potter's wheel. The ceramics of Leyla-Tape differ completely from those of Kultepe and Shomutape in terms of their advanced form and quality, and may indicate an intermediate stage between the Eneolithic culture and the Kura–Araxes culture.	Pottery discovered from Leyla-Tepe settlement, Nizami Ganjavi Ganja State History-Ethnography Museum	40°09′31″N 47°09′39″E
9	Toyretepe	Ashagi Goychali, Aghstafa District	It is a settlement belonging to the Neolithic-Bronze period, located 2 km north-east of the Shomutape settlement, in the territory of Ashagi Goychali village of Aghstafa district. In 1961, 1962, 1964 and 1965, excavations were carried out in the area of 100 square meters. Five building layers were discovered during the excavation. In the fifth layer, which is the lowest layer of Toyretepe, the remains of a circular semi-excavated building, as well as a number of circular brick buildings, were found. The remains of buildings found in other construction layers of Toyretepe are also circular in shape. Household jars buried in the floor were also found inside the houses. The remains of a quadrangular building were also discovered in the second and first construction layers of Toyretepe. Some of the circular and square-shaped buildings in the second construction layer (building No. 4) were built with two rows of mud bricks. Working tools made of stone and bone, including grain stones, sickle teeth, bone buckles, semi-finished products made of bone and flint, and a stone human figure were obtained from Toyretepe.		41°06′59″N 45°28′56″E
10	Misharchay settlement	Jalilabad District	It is a settlement belonging to the Eneolithic-Early Iron Age, 1.5 km northeast of the city of Jalilabad, on the bank of the river of the same name. The lower layer of Misharchay yielded material belonging to the Kura–Araxes culture, and the layer above it yielded material belonging to the Middle Bronze Age. In contrast to the Kura–Araxes layer (4.5 m), the very low accumulation of the Middle Bronze Age layer indicates that life in the settlement was based on semi-nomadic cattle breeding during this period. Stone and bone tools and ceramics were discovered from this layer of the settlement. Ceramic products are divided into two groups according to their morphological and technological characteristics. The first group includes brown, dark-spotted, fairly coarse kitchen utensils. Sand, gravel and clay loam were added to their clay. Jugs with wide mouths, cylindrical necks and double handles stand out among the vessels in this group. They were smoothed and lightly polished. The upper part of the body and the shoulder were embroidered with a geometric motif. A Christmas tree-shaped ornament was placed under the throat, and dotted triangles were placed below it. The second group includes gray and black thin-walled ceramics. The sand was added to their clay, well stroked and polished to a shine. Among the vessels included in this group, jugs with fine incised decoration and connelure ornament are noteworthy. In the decoration of the ceramics in this group, the combination of scratched lines and dots was widely used.		
11	Baba-Dervish	Demirchilar, Qazax District	It is a Bronze Age settlement located in Demirchilar village of Gazakh district. The ancient settlement was built on one of the hills where the Agstafachay valley meets the mountain range. The oldest of the cultural layers discovered during excavations in the area of 600 m2 in the settlement is the Eneolithic layer characterized by semi-excavated houses. The thickness of the Kura–Araxes layer located above it is 50–60 cm. This layer consists of material and cultural remains such as layers of ash, clay brick fragments, remains of plastered pits, river stones, etc. 25 pits used for agricultural purposes were found in the layer. Fragments of clay pots, household items, animal bones and burnt grain remains were found inside farm pits. A stone stela decorated with a double spiral was found in the central part of the excavation. It is possible that this stela played the role of a shrine as part of a single complex with a ritual hearth. A lot of building remains, fragments of clay bricks, fragments of plaster, river stones, etc. that were recorded in the settlement shows the existence of circular-shaped, above-ground constructions. The ceramic ware found at the settlement is diverse. One group of them, which was crudely made, was archaic in form. The other group includes black polished, patterned vessels. It is likely that the monument was inhabited during all stages of the Kura–Araxes culture.	Clay animal figures discovered from I Kultepe and Baba-Dervish settlements, Azerbaijan History Museum Pottery decorated with pictographic ornaments discovered from Baba-Dervish settlement, Azerbaijan History Museum	41°04′22″N 45°18′18″E
12	Kultepe and Makhta settlements	Makhta, Sharur District	Makhta Kultepe settlement is located in the west of Makhta village of Sharur district, on the left bank of the Aras river. Its southwestern part was destroyed during the construction of the railway. The area of the intact part of the settlement is 3 hectares. In 1988–1989, V.H. Aliyev and S.H. Ashurov carried out research works in the area of 100 m2 in the settlement area, and found construction remains made of clay bricks on a stone foundation, pieces of clay pots, and parts of the stove. During the exploratory research, an ancient stone temple was discovered in the area surrounded by the settlement, and stone idols were found inside it. The ceramic ware and building remains of the settlement belong to the middle stage of the Kura–Araxes culture. It is likely that the inhabitants of the settlement once used the water channel drawn from Arpachay.		39°35′18″N 44°56′52″E
13	I Kultepe	Kultepe (Babek), Babek District	It is a settlement belonging to the Eneolithic-Bronze period located in Kultepe village of Babek district. The total area of the monument is 1.5 hectares. In the years 1951–1964, in the settlement, 4 cultural layers with a thickness of 22.2 meters were discovered during the excavations conducted by O.H. Habibullayev. The stratigraphy of the monument shows that the settlement belonging to the Kura-Araxes period was built on the Eneolithic layer. According to O.H. Habibullayev, the Kura-Araxes layer is separated from the Eneolithic layer by a sterile layer in the thickness of 30–40 cm. The second layer of the settlement belonging to the Kura-Araxes culture is located at a depth of 3.4-4.5–12.4-1.3 m above the monument. This layer, which is rich in terms of cultural remains, is 8.5–9 m thick. The cultural layer consists of a mixture of different volumes of river stones, clay brick remains, osteological remains, obsidian, flint fragments, coal remains, ash and soil layers. Ash remains were mainly collected around stoves, barbecues and hearths. Various stones, bones, metal objects and ceramics were found in the layer. 14 construction layers belonging to the Kura-Araxes period were discovered in I Kultepe settlement. They are characterized by similar farm-household complexes. The residential houses registered in the lower layers are mainly circular in plan, while the houses in the upper layers are mainly quadrangular. Some houses with a circular plan have a rectangular extension. River stone, clay brick and seal were used as building materials.	Red painted earthenware found in I Kultepe settlement, Azerbaijan History Museum Pottery jar discovered from I Kultepe settlement, Azerbaijan History Museum Knives made of camel's eye found in the settlement of I Kultepe, Azerbaijan History Museum	39°16′13″N 45°27′07″E
14	II Kultepe	Ashagy Uzunoba, Babek District	It is a Bronze Age settlement located in the territory of Ashagy Uzunoba village of Babek district. The lower layer of the monument belongs to the Kura-Araxes period. The thickness of the cultural layer varies depending on the terrain. Excavations conducted in the second excavation area of the settlement, on an area of 200 m2, yielded significant results. In this area, the Kura-Araxes layer is located at a depth of 4-4.5 – 14 m above the monument. The thickness of the layer is 9.5–10 m. The stratigraphy of the monument shows that in ancient times, the settlement was built directly on the indented-protruding bank of the Dzhagrichay river. The non-continuity of the cultural layer in some places indicates that the area where the settlement was built was uneven at first. In connection with the collection of the layer, the living space was leveled. The cultural layer consists of seals, brick walls, osteological and charcoal remains, as well as layers of ash and burnt soil. Obsidian and flint shards, pieces of clay pots, stone bones and metal objects were found in the layer. The sequence of accumulation of the cultural layer is clearly visible in the sections. Although the walls of the buildings look like seals at the first glance, their careful observation showed that the buildings were built with bricks. It was determined that there were 14 construction layers in the First Bronze Age layer of II Kultepe.	A painted vessel discovered from the settlement of II Kultepe, Azerbaijan History Museum A red and black painted vessel belonging to the period of the Painted Pottery culture discovered in II Kultepe, Azerbaijan History Museum	39°16′29″N 45°26′23″E
15	Sarkartepe	Sarkarli, Khachmaz District	It is a Bronze Age settlement located in Sarkarli village of Khachmaz district. In 1982–1986, during the excavations conducted in Sarkartepe, located in Khachmaz district, it was possible to restore the architecture of the residential buildings of this period to a certain extent. Here, the remains of a residential building with a circular plan, built of clay bricks with a mixture of straw, were discovered. Inside all the houses, circular hearths made of clay, slightly widening upwards, were recorded. The floors of the houses were made of mud bricks and plastered with clay. The thickness of the cultural layer belonging to the Early Bronze Age was 4 m. An Early Bronze Age shrine was discovered during the research conducted at the settlement. The sanctuary discovered from Sarkartape is particularly important for the study of the ideological views of people living in the Early Bronze Age. The inner structure of the sanctuary is similar to the sanctuaries found in II Kultepe. However, the Sarkartepe sanctuary is better preserved. In its central part, a circular hearth, an altar near the northern wall, a brazier with six circular horn-shaped protrusions near the hearth, and worship tools with horn-shaped protrusions were discovered near the altar. According to the researchers, the rich motif patterns on the ceramic products found in Sarkartape, including the Moon, Sun, and horse images, reflected the ideological views of the ancient people. The findings show that the cult of the celestial bodies, along with the cult of the bull, which is considered the source of fertility, also played an important role in fertility ceremonies at the sanctuaries.		41°24′24″N 48°46′22″E
16	Uzerliktapa	Aghdam	It is located in the east of Aghdam city, in a geographically favorable position. The settlement has an irregular oval plan. The diameter of its widest circle from north to south is 202 m. Archaeological excavations were carried out in an area of 484 m2. The cultural layer is 3 meters thick in the settlement area built on a natural hill. During the archaeological excavations, 3 building layers were discovered. The first construction layer is characterized by the presence of various pits used for different purposes. Some of them were filled with kitchen leftovers and ashes. The huts lined with straw were used to keep animals. Remains of a residential building made of poles were found in this layer. Its walls were woven from thick sticks and plastered with clay. The roof of the building was covered with tree bark, and the earthen floor was covered with mats. Broken clay pots were found on the floor, and the remains of a clay oven were found inside the broken hearth. It was determined that the clay bush found in the furnace contained a frozen metal alloy. River stone blocks, graters and stone molds were obtained near the hearth. This house was characterized by K. Kh. Kushnareva as a "caster's house". The clay objects found in this layer are divided into 2 groups, kitchen and household utensils. Ceramics were fired in gray or black. Household utensils were well-polished. The bowls are decorated with scratched ornaments with various motifs. Floors and household items stored on them were found. Ceramics of the second and third layers were considered as a single complex by K. Kh. Kushnaryeva. During this period, there was considerable progress in the preparation of clay products. The scratch ornament used in the lower layer was replaced by a more elaborate ornament. In this period, painted vessels appeared, which are completely different from the black ceramics of Uzerliktapa. K. Kh. Kushnaryeva connects the appearance of painted vessels with the progress in the development of pottery.		
17	Gamigaya Petroglyphs	Nasirvas, Ordubad District	Gamigaya is the mythical name of Kaputjugh, the highest peak of the Lesser Caucasus mountains. It is located 60 km north of the city of Ordubad, between the villages of Tivi and Nasirvas. On the surface of the metamorphosed tuff scattered on the southern part of the mountain, smoothed as a result of natural erosion, images reflecting the way of life and thinking of ancient people were drawn. Gamigaya drawings were first recorded in 1969. In 1969–1971, hundreds of rock paintings were discovered by V. H. Aliyev in the Garangush, Nabiyurdu, Camisholen meadows at the southern foot of Gamigaya, at an altitude of 3500–3700 m above sea level. During the research conducted in 2001–2005, more than two thousand rock paintings were recorded in Gamigaya. Among the rock paintings, hunting scenes are especially interesting. One group of pictures shows mountain goats caught with a lasso or net. A group of mountain goats, given in pairs, was placed opposite. Perhaps it represents a scene of animal combat. Among the rock paintings, there are images of bulls, deer, and tigers. Separate images of horses, dogs and fantastic animals occupy a certain place among Gamigaya paintings. Some animals were created by combining geometric figures. Among the Gamigaya Petroglyphs, human paintings occupy an important place. They mainly consist of silhouette images drawn with thin lines. They were depicted with round heads, legs apart or bent at the knees, hands raised.	General view of the Gamigaya area A rock with a goat and a totem depicted on it in Gamigaya area	39°9′36″N 45°55′12″E
18	Sarija-Minbarak monuments	Minbarak plain, Qakh District	It is a complex of monuments belonging to IV-III millennia BC. The complex includes more than 200 mounds. The Sarija-Minbarak group of monuments was in scientific research since 1984. As a result of archaeological exploration, excavation and scientific research conducted by ANAS Institute of Archeology and Ethnography employees, 4 ancient settlements, temporary stops, hundreds of barrows from the Bronze Age, 2 necropolises, ancient sanctuaries, remains of castle walls were recorded and involved in archaeological research. As a result of the conducted scientific research, it was clarified that this area was more densely populated and made great progress since the end of the IV millennium. The thickness of the cultural layer in Minbarak settlement is more than 4 m. Khojaly-Gadabay and Yaloylutepe cultures were also represented here with their monuments. The material and cultural samples obtained during the archaeological excavations allow to follow all the Bronze Ages and Iron Age, to study the burial customs of the aborigines, the spiritual culture, mythical and philosophical worldviews embedded in the stones during this long period.		
19	Yazdegerd Castle	Nakhchivan	It is an early medieval castle located in the south of Nakhchivan city. This castle is also known as the Naringala part of the medieval city of Nakhchivan. The castle is believed to have been built by the last Sassanid ruler Yazdegerd III (632 – 651/52). The exact date of construction of the castle is not known. In 1957 - 1959, during the research conducted in the territory of the castle, rich archaeological materials, in particular, pottery fragments, stone maces were discovered. It is known from archaeological research that such stone maces were used in the Bronze Age (III - II millennia BC) in salt mines. According to the Turkish traveler Evliya Chelebi, the Mongols destroyed the castle. Jean Chardin and Frehang, who later visited Nakhchivan, also mentioned that fortress. The castle was active until the 18th century. In the plan of the city of Nakhchivan in 1827, this castle was marked schematically. According to the plan, the castle consisted of two parts - a small castle (Naringala) and a big castle. Boyukgala suffered more than Naringala. The area of Boyukgala, which is rectangular in shape (185x400 m), is 74,000 m^{2}. The preserved walls of this castle, which are believed to have been built or restored later than Naringala, and the walls made of clay and gravel, and the remains of square-shaped (19x19x5 cm) pink and yellow baked bricks, prove that the building belongs to the Middle Ages. The surviving parts of Naringala's walls, made of rammed earth with the addition of river stones, reach a thickness of 3.5 to 4 m. Naringala has round towers, mostly 10 m in diameter. It is assumed that the gate of Naringala was next to the tower in its western corner.	The view of the castle walls before restoration The statue of the ruler of Caucasian Albania, Javanshir, discovered in the ancient territory of Nakhchivan, Hermitage	39°11′43″N 45°24′50″E
20	Borsunlu mounds	Borsunlu, Tartar District	The necropolis is located around the village of Borsunlu, in the middle part of Incechay. A group of mounds in the Borsunlu necropolis was studied by H. F. Jafarov. The mounds gathered in separate groups were divided into five types by H. F. Jafarov. Some of the mounds were surrounded by cromlechs. The grave chambers located under the mound were square-shaped and built of stone slabs fixed with mortar. Some tomb chambers have an entrance. Inhumation, cremation, and collective burials were characteristic of Borsunlu mounds. The tomb chamber of mound No. 1 studied in the Borsunlu necropolis is circular, and the tomb chamber of mound No. 30 is quadrangular. Remains of human skeletons, black polished clay pots and other materialistic and cultural remains were discovered from the graves.	Pottery from Borsunlu mound, Nizami Ganjavi Ganja State History-Ethnography Museum Pottery discovered in Borsunlu mound, Nizami Ganjavi Ganja State History-Ethnography Museum	40°26′37″N 46°51′48″E
21	Zazaly temple	Zazaly, Samukh District	It is a temple belonging to the Late Bronze - Early Iron Age, located in Zazaly village of Samukh district, 4 km away from the center. Probably, it was restored in the later period and used as a Christian temple as well. It is currently in danger of collapsing. The temple is about 35–40 meters long and 4–5 meters wide. Currently, that building has become invisible because it remains under the ground. But the elders of Zazaly village say that this temple was built about 3 meters below the surface of the earth and it was possible to enter it 40–50 years ago.		40°43′05″N 46°28′25″E
22	Khojaly mounds	Khojaly District	It is one of the well-investigated monuments of Khojaly-Gadabay culture. The monument is a Bronze Age cemetery near Khojaly. Small mounds and cromlechs were discovered here. There were individual and collective burials in these mounds. In some mounds, the custom of burning was also recorded. Among the monuments, ceramics, weapons and ornaments typical of the Khojaly-Gadabay culture were discovered. Mound No. 11 studied in Khojaly introduced particularly important results. A bead inscribed with the name of the Assyrian king Adadnirari was found in this mound. I. I. Meshaninov stated that this bead belongs to the 8th century BC. However, in later studies, the researchers concluded that this bead dates to the time of Adadnirari I, that is, around end of the 9th century BC and the beginning of the 8th century BC. One of the household jars found in the Khojaly mounds has an image of wheat on the handle.	A bead inscribed with the name of Adadnirari III in cuneiform, discovered from the Khojaly mound, Azerbaijan History Museum Agate necklace discovered from Khojaly mound, Hermitage	
23	I Shahtakhty temple; II Shahtakhty temple	Shahtakhty, Kangarli District	The Shahtakhty settlement was built in a convenient geographical position near the Shahtakhty village of Kangarli district, at the southern end of the Qivrag plateau. A 3-meter-thick cultural layer was found during small excavations conducted by A. K. Alakbarov at the settlement in 1936. In 1979–1981, archaeological excavations were carried out on an area of 100 m2 in the Shahtakhty settlement. Excavations revealed the remains of the Middle Bronze Age defensive wall, grain stones, and clay products. Among the findings, there are monochrome painted pots and clay pots with basma patterns. Since the residential buildings found here were destroyed, it was not possible to determine their plan. Based on the surviving wall remains, it can be said that river stones and bricks were used in their construction. The length of the defensive wall is 20 m, width 2.3 m, height 1.2 m. Two large necropolises are located near the Shahtakhty settlement. One of them is on the north-east side of the settlement, and the other is on the south-west side. Grave monuments belonging to different stages of the Bronze Age and the Early Iron Age were studied in both necropolises. In the necropolis located in the northeast, there are many graves from the Middle Bronze Age. The graves are stone box type. In 1936, a complete horse skeleton, 1 polychrome painted jug, 29 gray simple vessels and other items were found from the cromlech stone box grave investigated by A. K. Alakbarov in this necropolis. The graves in the second necropolis are also stone box type. However, the stone boxes here have no surface markings. This necropolis was discovered by accident while doing farm work. The materials of some graves registered in this necropolis were published by V. H. Aliyev. Polychrome painted vessels, bronze objects, and a cylindrical seal were found in the graves. Most of the graves explored in this necropolis belong to the Late Bronze and Early Iron Age. Grave monuments are mainly of stone box type. Human skeletons were not found in these graves, and ashes were found in some of them.	A pottery vessel with a deer image from the period of the Painted Pottery culture discovered in the Shahtakhty settlement, Azerbaijan History Museum Gold ornament discovered in Shahtakhty, Azerbaijan History Museum	39°22′19″N 45°05′46″E
24	Oghlangala	Oghlangala, Sharur District	It is located in Oghlangala village of Sharur district, on Garatepe mountain on the coast of Arpachay. The area of the Oghlangala settlement is 40 hectares, and the thickness of the cultural layer is more than 3 meters. The northern slopes of the mountain are steep. Other slopes are surrounded by magnificent defensive walls. The walls were built of roughly hewn stones 1.5–3 meters long and more than 1 meter thick. In this regard, there are also researchers who attribute Oghlangala to cyclopean buildings. Excavations carried out in the Oghlangala settlement show that the defense constructions here is not older than the 9th century BC. Remains of stone columns discovered in the square in the center of Oghlangala, with an area of 70x100 m, show that once there were magnificent palace and temple-type buildings here. The square is surrounded by walls in some places.	Remains of a cyclopean tower in Oghlangala settlement	39°35′41″N 45°03′28″E
25	Chobandashi settlement and necropolis	Dagkesaman, Aghstafa District	It is a settlement belonging to the Late Bronze - Early Iron periods and located in Dagkesaman village of Agstafa district.		41°05′56″N 45°23′39″E
26	Boyuk qalacha	Sogyutlyu, Gadabay District	It is a settlement and a defensive fortress belonging to the Late Bronze - Early Iron Age, located in the village of Sogyutlyu, Gadabay district. It is a towering mountain made of huge stones. According to some experts, this castle, built in the first Iron Age, had a defensive purpose. In 1947, certain excavation and research were carried out here.		40°32′51.81″N 45°54′4.16″E
27	Niftaly mounds	Khubyarli, Jabrayil District	These are Bronze Age monuments located in the village of Khubyarli, Jabrayil district.		
28	Qizilburun settlement	Tazakend, Kangarli District	The settlement of Qizilburun is located 18 km south of Nakhchivan, on the left bank of the Araz river, in the area called Qizilburun. The area of the surviving part of the settlement is 2 ha. Here, in 1969, archaeological excavations were carried out in two areas. The area of exploratory excavations in the first area was 3 x 3.5 m. Gray and pink ceramics, monochrome painted potsherds, dried sickle teeth were found here. In the second excavation area (10 x 10 m), it was determined that the cultural layer with a thickness of 3 meters remained in a better condition. During the excavations, at a depth of 1.6 m, the remains of a square and oval-shaped building from the Middle Bronze Age were discovered. During the investigation, simple gray and pink ceramics, monochrome painted potsherds, obsidian plates, sickle teeth, grain stones, arrowheads, bone bits were discovered from the buildings. The necropolis of Qızılburun is located next to the settlement. The necropolis was registered in 1895 by the accidental collapse of stone box-type graves. As a result of the excavations conducted by N.V. Fyodorov and I.I. Meshaninov, several grave monuments from the Middle Bronze Age were studied in the necropolis.		
29	Chalkhangala Fortress; Chalkhangala mounds	Chalkhangala, Kangarli District	It is a complex of Bronze Age monuments located in the territory of Chalkhangala village of Kangarli district. The fortress is located in the west of the Jahrichay river, which flows in the north–south direction, at an altitude of 1840 meters above sea level. It is possible to climb to Chalkhangala from the Jahri river valley from the east and north. As in the case of Vaikhir Castle, no archaeological materials were found here. Probably, the castle was not used as a permanent settlement, but for the purpose of defense in case of danger. Chalkhangala was built on the southern side of a steep rock with a flat surface and consists of only one wall. Since this part of the settlement is not naturally defended, a defensive wall is needed. The length of this wall in the east–west direction is approximately 350–360 meters. The western end of the wall connects to a high cliff, and the eastern end to a steep cliff. The castle wall is not straight, but built in accordance with the relief of the land, and it was reinforced with protrusions from the inside and outside. The wall is 2.3-2.7 meters thick and 2.5-2.7 meters high. It is believed that the wall was higher in the early times. The most important feature of the defensive wall of Chalkhangala is that the walls were built in a protruding form outwards and inwards at a certain distance. The castle has two gates, one in the south-west and the other in the south-east. The gate in the southwest is 2.4-2.5 meters wide and 3.1 meters high. The door was covered with a whole slab of stone. Chalkhangala mounds are located 30 km northwest of Nakhchivan city, near Chalkhangala village of Kangarli district. For these mounds, burial of only one person was typical. Three of the burial mounds in the necropolis were destroyed during construction. The destroyed mounds were studied by V.H. Aliyev. Since the mounds were heavily destroyed, it was not possible to determine the shape of the burial chamber. From one of the mounds (mound no. 1), gray and monochrome painted vessels, a leaf-shaped bronze spearhead, from the second (mound no. 2), gray, monochrome painted vessels, bronze daggers, a tubular spearhead, bronze pins, beads and a fragment of a ribbon-shaped bronze object were found.		
30	Khachbulag mounds	Khachbulag plain, Dashkasan District	These are mounds belonging to the Middle Bronze Age, located in the Khachbulag plain of Dashkasan district. Mound No. 1 in Khachbulag is located on the left bank of Goshgarchay, east of the modern cemetery of Zagali village. The height of the circular mound was 0.75 meters, its diameter was 11.5 meters in the north–south direction, and 10 meters in the east–west direction. The main grave of the mound belongs to the First Bronze Age. A jug with a hemispherical handle and bone beads were found here. Two graves found in the soil cover of the mound at a depth of 1.45 and 1.7 meters belong to the Middle Bronze Age. The shape of the grave dug in the ground was determined. The skeleton in the first grave was completely decomposed. He was buried in a twisted position from northwest to southeast. Bovine animal bones and charcoal were found near the legs of the skeleton. Around the skull, black, brown, and pink colored scratched clay vessels, a stone mace, a pipe-supported spearhead, obsidian and flint arrowheads, and a bronze dagger were found. In 1959, in the Khachbulag plain, in the place called "Hamamduzu", three mounds were studied, two of which belong to the Middle Bronze Age. The first of those mounds is circular, with a diameter of 8.6 m and a height of 0.6 m. The burial chamber was discovered on the southern side of the mound. When the stone mound covering the grave was removed, pieces of obsidian and coal remains were found. A 33 cm long four-pronged bayonet-type spearhead was found in the second main grave of the mound. Archaeologist H.P. Kasamanli compared that spearhead with similar spearheads found in Transcaucasia and Eastern Asia, and concluded that these belong to III millennium BC.	Clay pot with pictographs discovered from Khachbulag mounds, Nizami Ganjavi Ganja State History-Ethnography Museum Amulet discovered from Khachbulag mounds, Nizami Ganjavi Ganja State History-Ethnography Museum	
31	Kharabagilan	Aza, Ordubad District	It is a complex of monuments belonging to the Late Bronze - Early Iron Age, located in Aza village of Ordubad region. Kharabagilan, with an area of more than 100 hectares, was studied in 1926-1929 and since 1976. On the western side of the monument, a settlement and a necropolis dating back to the II-I millennia BC were discovered. The area of Naringala is more than 10 hectares and it was previously surrounded by the walls of the castle together with the neighborhoods. At the same time, the fortress walls were fortified with square and round turrets. Stone, raw and baked brick dwellings, caravansaras, tombs, mosques, as well as crafts centers and other construction remains were discovered, and many material and cultural samples were found. During the finds, inscriptions with Kufic and Naskh lines were found on clay vessels and architectural fragments of the 12th-14th centuries. Scientists studying the monument of Kharabagilan say that the culture of the city was founded in the 5th-4th centuries BC, and since the Middle Ages, this city has been one of the important trade and craft centers of Azerbaijan. As a result of research, it became clear that the destruction of the city of Gilan dates back to the period of Mongol invasions. As a result of the researches of the Kharabagilan archaeological expedition of the ANAS Institute of Archeology and Anthropology operating in the Ordubad district, clay pots corresponding to layer K ceramics of the Goytepe monument located near Urmiya were discovered from the mounds in the monument area. According to researcher Bahlul İbrahimli, this type of ceramics, which is mostly distributed in monuments around Nakhchivan and Urmia, proves that both regions were in a single archaeological cultural area in the Middle Bronze Age. During the archaeological research conducted in the area of Kharabagilan, a text written in ancient Aramaic script was found in a tomb belonging to the 2nd-3rd centuries in the south-east of the city's fortress wall, on the outer side of the wall.	One of the towers of Gilan city fortress Silver drachm of Darius I, ruler of Atropatena. It was discovered in the territory of Kharabagilan and is exhibited in the Azerbaijan History Museum. Aramaic inscribed bowl, Kharabagilan. Azerbaijan History Museum.	38°56′19″N 45°50′54″E
32	Kish settlement; Church of Kish	Kish, Shaki District	It is a complex of monuments belonging to the ancient and medieval times located in Kish village of Shaki district. According to the "History of the Country of Albania", St. Elisæus, who was sent to Albania to preach Christianity by Jesus' brother of religion, St. Jacob, first served as a missionary in Chola and Uti provinces for a while, and then he went to the village called "Gish" and built a church there. Modern Christian theologians believe that this event occurred shortly after the year 60. The Kish church belongs to the group of hall-shaped churches covered with a dome, and is completed with a semicircular apse on the east side. The planning solution of the church has characteristic features of early medieval Caucasian Albanian architecture. The rather long prayer hall is divided into two parts by a pair of pilasters. The altar apse joins the hall from the east side. During the archeological excavations, an earthen grave was discovered under the semi-arched protrusion of the north-eastern walls of the temple. The cover of the grave consisted of 3 layers, the first layer was made of clay, coal, ash and earth, the second layer was made of clay, and the third layer was made of a mixture similar to the first layer. The 90 x 60 cm oval earthen grave in the clay soil was in the east–west direction. The grave was inserted into the base of the eastern wall of the temple, where the floor was leveled and the corners pressed, and two small bull heads were buried on the ash floor. They were placed on large fragments of a red pottery cup and their faces were directed to the east. On and around the skulls, broken pieces of different types of pottery, a broken horn, a round stone, and a bone arrow were found among other bones of animals. Pottery equipment of the grave consists of parts of large vessels, which also belong to the Kura–Araxes culture. Nipple-shaped handles, egg-shaped body of the cup, comb-shaped decoration, etc. are aspects typical of late Eneolithic pottery. Pottery is of local character. The earthen grave with 2 bull heads is undoubtedly of a ritual nature.	St. Elisæus Church located in Kish Bone remains indicating the custom of animal burial Remains of pottery discovered as a result of archaeological research	41°15′0″N 47°11′30″E
33	Kabalaka, Salbir fortress	Chukhurkabala, Qabala District	It is a complex of monuments belonging to the ancient and medieval times, located in Chukhur-Gabala village of Gabala region. According to a topographical plan drawn in 1959, the ruins of the city were 25 hectares. A once man-made defensive moat divides the ruins of the city into two parts. The local population calls the part on the North side of the moat "Salbir", and the part on the South side of the moat is called "Gala". Both parts are sometimes called "Salbir", "Govur-gala", and sometimes only the "Gala" part of the city is called "Govur-gala". Since 1959, 3–4 km east of the city ruins of Gabala, in the place called Gullu reserve or Chaggalli tala by the local population, a third area of ancient Gabala, which is believed to be the temple site and the market square, and later the Kamaltepe and Bayir city parts, were discovered. In general, Gabala city ruins, according to its historical geography, currently consist of a complex of archaeological monuments named Salbir, Gullu reserve (Chaggalli tala), Kamaltepe and Bayir city.	Remains of Gabala fortress Pottery found in Gabala Castle, Azerbaijan National Art Museum	40°53′23″N 47°42′56″E
34	The ancient city of Shamakhi	Shamakhi District	Shamakhi is located in the central part of Shirvan, approximately 749 meters above sea level, in a favorable geographical position. In the south of Shamakhi flows Zogalavay, and in the east of Pirsaat rivers. The city is surrounded by Binasli and Gushan from the north, Pirdiraki and Gulustan castles from the northwest, and Meysari mountains from the west. The name of Shamakhi was mentioned for the first time in ancient sources - in the work "Geography" of the Greek geographer Claudius Ptolemy, among the 29 cities of the country of Albania, in the form of "Mamakhia", "Camaxheya" or "Kemakheya". In later sources, the city was called "Kemakhiyya", "Ashshamakhiyya", when the Arabs changed its name to "Yezidiyya" for a short time, and then again to this day, "Shemakhi" and "Shamakhi". During archaeological excavations around Shamakhi, a large public building destroyed during the Mongol attack was discovered. Traces of fire, which are clearly visible from the layers of the 13th century, confirm the information given by the sources about the destruction of Shamakhi by Mongol troops.		
35	Monuments of Nyuydi	Nyuydi, Agsu District	Discovered on the plain of Nyuydi in the Southwest of Nyuydi village of Agsu district. It is a complex of archaeological monuments dating back to the 3rd-1st centuries. The total area of the complex is 10-12 hectares. During the archaeological research carried out in 1961–1965, a lot of tools (grain stones, crickets, iron china, household jars), as well as river stone house foundations, various household equipment, and pottery, decorative items, various weapons, osteological remains and other artifacts were found from the settlement. During the archaeological excavations conducted in 1972-1973 and 1975 (thickness of the cultural layer is about 1.5 m), building remains, farm well, jugs, grainstone, stone buckle, flint and camel's eye tool fragments were found. The necropolis consists mainly of earthen graves (about 50 graves have been studied), except for a few pit graves. Many ceramics, iron spears, hoes, sickles, knives, bronze bracelets, rings, earrings, pins, glass beads and other decorative items were discovered here. A variety of decorated red and black fine earthenware was baked in a potter's jug. As a result of the excavations, a hoard of silver coins - Nyuydi hoard and individual coin samples were also discovered.	Nyuydi treasure Albanian warrior's helmet, Azerbaijan History Museum	40°41′39″N 48°24′01″E
36	Chanakhir hills	Canakhir, Khachmaz District	It is an archaeological monument belonging to the ancient-early medieval period, located near the village of Chanakhir in Khachmaz district, on the shore of Agchay. The examples of pre-Islamic civilization found during farming and plowing related to the construction of engineering facilities, as great historical information lies under the thick layers of soil in this area, and the tools, weapons and ornaments made of bronze, iron and pottery obtained here are many examples of craftsmanship in different periods of history. At the end of the 1970s, when a canal for irrigation was built at the foot of the Mound, local schoolchildren noticed that the wall of the canal was blown away and found the remains of a woman's skeleton here. They found earrings on her, thin bracelets on her arms, and other bronze pendants. Apart from that, round bronze ornaments of various sizes with a sharvari top, remains of horse reins and rivets were also discovered here.		41°25′0″N 48°49′0″E
37	Babatepe settlement	Yurdchu, Kangarli District	It is a complex of archaeological monuments located near Yurdchu village of Kangarli district. The area of the monument is 2 hectares. The settlement was registered in 1983. Surface findings consist of broken clay pots and stone tools and are divided into two periods. The first period includes pottery and tools typical of the early Iron Age. The surface materials found during the searches consist of pebbles, pink and gray colored clay potsherds. It is believed that the settlement dates back to the 10th - 8th centuries BC.		39°24′24″N 45°9′6″E
38	Ancient Ganja	Ganja	The complex of archaeological monuments, located 6–7 km northeast of Ganja city, was the ancient city site of Ganja city until the 17th century. In 1935–1937, in order to enrich the fund of the Kirovabad Ethnography Museum (now the Nizami Ganjavi Ganja State History-Ethnography Museum), the director of the museum, E. R. Khadarin, partially excavated north of the fortification on the right bank of the area where Ganja surface architectural monuments are located. As a result, ceramics, glass, pottery, bone and other hand tools belonging to the Middle Ages were found and an exhibition was created and displayed. Later, as a result of regular excavations, many such objects were discovered. Religious rituals, everyday life and occupation scenes of the population are reflected on many of them with ornaments. In 1938–1940, Ishaq Jafarzade noted the results of the archaeological excavations of the city in his essay "History-Excavations of Ancient Ganja". In 1981–1982, as a result of archaeologist Jabbar Khalilov's research in the area of Ancient Ganja, a cultural layer belonging to the 9th-17th centuries and many valuable art samples were discovered. Among them, a pottery vessel with hieroglyphs made in China was discovered.	Ancient Ganja	40°42′55″N 46°25′17″E
39	Ancient Beylagan	Beylagan	The complex of archaeological monuments, located 15 km northwest of the city of Beylagan, is the site of the ancient city of Paytakaran in the 5th-13th centuries. In 1933, scientific staff of ANAS under the leadership of I. I. Meshshaninov started Archaeological excavations in Orangala for the first time. The second excavation was conducted in 1936 under the leadership of Alakbarov. As a result of the excavations, it was possible to draw an approximate plan of the city and to give the characteristics of the cultural layers in some places. A. Alakbarov studied the remains of houses belonging to feudal lords and wealthy townspeople in the excavation area. Apart from these, the scientist suggested that the smaller houses that were discovered belonged to artisans. As a result of the archaeological excavations conducted by A. Alakbarov in Orangala city site, it was found that the main part of material culture remains obtained from different layers of the excavation site consists of ceramic samples. The third archaeological excavation in Orangala was conducted by an expedition organized by the Institute of History of ANAS in January 1951 under the leadership of I. M. Jafarzade. During these excavations, it was determined that the northwest ditch of the Little City cut the northeast wall of the Big City deeply, not at the surface, and it was clarified that this wall was first built of mud bricks mixed with straw, and then of seal. The excavations of 1953-1957 were conducted by the Leningrad branch of the Institute of Archeology of the AS of the SSR and the joint expedition of the History Institute of the AS of the Azerbaijan SSR organized in 1953. This expedition, led by A. A. Iesse, was conducted in three different spots of Orangala.	Pottery plates discovered from Orangala, Azerbaijan History Museum	40°42′55″N 46°25′17″E
40	Ancient Barda	Barda	The complex of archaeological monuments located in the territory of the city of Barda is the ancient city site of the city of Partav. The city is surrounded by fortress walls. Barda Castle, popularly known as Nushaba Castle, according to some sources, was built in 1322 by Ahmed ibn Ayyub al Hafiz from Nakhchivan, a student of the famous architect Ajami school. The radius of the cylindrical fortress is 60 meters, the height is 13 meters, and the width of the masonry is 80 centimeters. There are information about Barda Castle in the works of many travelers. It is known that the castle was destroyed during the Mongol marches to Azerbaijan and was later restored. The 13th century traveler Hamdullah Gazvini wrote in his work "Nuzhat al Qulub" that the fortress was built by Alexander the Great before Christ. He also noted that the castle was renovated during the reign of Sassanid ruler Firuz. Nizami Ganjavi also described the Barda fortress in Iskandar Nama.	Model of the Ancient Barda, Barda Museum of History and Ethnography A plate with an artistic image discovered in the Ancient Barda, Azerbaijan History Museum	
41	Ancient Shamkir	Shamkir	The complex of archaeological monuments located in the territory of the city of Shamkir is an ancient city. The ruins of the medieval city of Shamkir are located on the left bank of the Shamkirchay, in the north of the village of Gadimgala, Shamkir district of the Republic of Azerbaijan. The description of the monument shows that it has all the signs typical of medieval towns. The 2007 topographical map of the city made it possible to determine the plan structure of the city close to a quadrilateral. Although the history of studying the medieval Shamkir city site began in the first quarter of the 19th century, extensive archaeological excavations here belong only to the first decade of the 20th century. In 2006–2013, archaeological excavations were conducted in six different areas of the city. As a result of archaeological excavations, many construction remains, including the remains of fortifications, civil buildings, and engineering facilities related to urban development were discovered.	Black-glazed earthenware vessel with swastika image discovered in Shamkir fortress, Azerbaijan History Museum	
42	Shabran	Shabran	The complex of archaeological monuments located in the territory of the city of Shabran is the site of an ancient city. The ruins of the city are near Shahnazarli village of Shabran region. During the excavations, fragments of clay and earthenware, bricks from the Sasanian period, tombs and other material cultural objects belonging to the early medieval city were discovered. According to S. T. Yeremyan, the city of Shabran was the center of the Sharvan province and the political center of the Massaget Arshaks in the early Middle Ages. Arab authors mention that Shabran was attacked by the Sasanian ruler Khosrow Anushirava I (531-579). Biberstein, who was in the Shabaran area at the end of the 18th century, wrote: "It was once an important city, but now only its ruins remain. The city of Shabaran is located in the plain on the left bank of the river which has the same name."	Ceramic sample discovered in Shabran	41°17′44″N 48°52′53″E
43	Alinja Tower	Khanagah, Julfa District	It is a 7th–12th-century tower located in Khanagah village of Julfa district. Starting from the reign of Shamseddin Eldeniz, the main treasure of the Atabay state was stored in the Alinja tower, and many of the palaces and auxiliary buildings in Alinja were built by order of the Atabays of Azerbaijan. The inner fortress of Alinja is located at the highest point of the mountain. Local people call this cave "Shahtakhti". The palaces of the judges, including the rulers of Eldegiz, are located on the Shahtakhti terrace. High construction culture can be seen in the tower walls of Alinja and the buildings inside the tower, finely worked stone details, which are considered unusual for the tower construction, are noticeable. It is for this reason that specialists consider Alinja Tower as one of the most beautiful works of the Nakhchivan-Maraga school of architecture. The walls of Alinjagala start from the foothills of Alinja mountain and rise upwards in the form of steps and completely cover its peak. The ancient part of the tower was built of large stones and baked bricks brought from the surrounding villages.	Alinja Tower	39°11′40″N 45°41′49″E
44	Gilgilchay fortifications complex	Bank of Gilgilchay, Shabran District	In Shabran district, on both banks of Gilgilchay, there are clay-stone dams consisting of two walls 220 meters apart. Arabic-language sources say that the foundation of this wall, called "Sur al-Tin" ("Clay wall"), was laid during the time of the Sasanian ruler Gubad (488-531). Starting from the place where the Gilgilchay River flows into the Caspian Sea, the walls of the barrier stretch to the top of Babadag for 60 kilometers. Chiraggala, which is included in the Gilgilchay wall, is a monument with the most playful silhouette among the mountain fortresses of Azerbaijan. Chiraggala, built in the 5th century, was the main support point of the Gilgilchay wall with its active position and solid structure.	Chiraggala	
45	Mugan Babazanli settlement	Chukhanly, Salyan District	Located in Chukhanly village of Salyan district, it is a settlement dating back to the 1st millennium BC. The settlement was discovered as a result of excavations during the construction of Alat-Astara highway. The archaeological expedition team of the Institute of Archeology and Ethnography of the Azerbaijan National Academy of Sciences conducted research in the ancient settlement. According to preliminary results, this area was inhabited from the 3rd century BC to the 3rd century AD. The uniqueness of this finding, which tells about the past of the area in detail, is that the settlement and the cemetery were located in the same area and belong to the same period. During the investigations, 5 bucket graves and 5 earthen graves were found. Among them there are graves of both children and adults. Archaeologist Arif Mammadov said that one of the pot graves discovered during the archaeological excavations had images related to shamanism.		39°38′40″N 48°58′31″E

== Literature ==
- Mammadali Huseynov, A. K. Jafarov – Paleolithic of Azerbaijan, Elm, 1986
- M. Huseynov – Ancient Paleolithic of Azerbaijan, Baku, Elm, 1985
- Archeology of Azerbaijan, in six volumes, I volume, Baku
- Bakhshaliyev, Vali (2006). Archeology of Azerbaijan, I volume. Baku: Nakhchivan Branch of Azerbaijan National Academy of Sciences, Nakhchivan State University.
- A. Alakbarov – Researches on archeology and ethnography of Azerbaijan, Baku, 1960

== See also ==
- List of World Heritage Sites in Azerbaijan
- UNESCO Intangible Cultural Heritage List in Azerbaijan
- Archaeological site of Qarachinar
