= Çuxanlı =

Çuxanlı or Chukhonly or Chukhanly may refer to:

- Çuxanlı, Absheron, Azerbaijan
- Çuxanlı, Gobustan, Azerbaijan
- Çuxanlı, Salyan, Azerbaijan
