= Archaeological site of Selbir =

The Salbir archaeological settlement is a historical site located in the Qabala District, Azerbaijan, near the modern village of Chukhur Qabala. It's one of the three main archaeological areas that make up the ancient city of Qabala, which was once the capital of Caucasian Albania.

While the broader Qabala urban complex dates back to the 4th century BC, the Salbir area specifically shows evidence of continuous occupation from roughly the 1st to the 10th centuries AD. It is located on the banks of the Karachay and Jovurluchay rivers at the foot of the Greater Caucasus Mountains.

== History ==
Ancient Qabala served as Caucasian Albania's capital for about 800 years, from the 4th century BC to the 5th century AD, and remained an administrative and economic center afterward. The city's location sometimes shifted due to invasions and natural disasters. The city's various historical eras are represented by the three primary archaeological zones: Chaggalli, Gala, and Salbir. The Sabirs, a Hunic tribe thought to have arrived in Caucasian Albania in the early first century, are frequently associated with the name "Salbir." The town's population declined following a significant event in the tenth century, and the northern portion became known as "Salbir," with a moat separating it from the southern "Gala." Additionally, there is evidence linking Qabala to the Khazars during this time, as the decline of the Khazar Khanate coincided with the fall of Salbir's primary habitation.

== Archaeology ==
Archaeologists discovered defensive walls composed of stone and clay bricks, which were later upgraded with burnt bricks in 15 distinct styles, demonstrating the city's strong fortifications. Remains of old city structures, including a big, likely two-story apartment building, have been uncovered, as well as ornate plastered interiors. Burial sites include Roman catacombs, Christian graves, and Muslim graves from the 12th to 13th centuries, showing the area's changing demography and beliefs.

The site also displays sophisticated urban infrastructure, including water supply lines, pools, ovens, and a medieval sewage system. Pottery kilns from the 8th-9th centuries CE, alongside household warehouses, indicate thriving craft industries.

Systematic archaeological research in the Qabala region began in 1926. More recently, since 2009, joint Azerbaijani-Korean archaeological expeditions, supported by the SEBA (Seoul-Baku) Azerbaijan-Korea Cultural Exchange Association, have focused on Salbir.

On the basis of the uncovered cultural layers, Azerbaijani archaeologists such as Ilyas Babayev, Gafar Jabiyev, and Jeyhun Eminli, as well as Korean scholars under the direction of Kim Jong-il, have researched the development of Gabala's early urban culture, urbanization processes, and sustainable lifestyles. Some of the unearthed remains have been covered to protect the site. These continuing investigations in Salbir, Gala, and Chaggalli are supported by the Gabala Archaeological Center, which opened in 2014 and offers exhibition spaces, a restoration lab, and archaeologist facilities.

Numerous artifacts have been recovered, including antique and medieval ceramics, 10th-century glazed vessels, glassware, stone items, and "cake beads." Coins and other finds suggest extensive trade networks with Chinese, Middle Eastern, and Roman empires.

In 2017, a large residential building was discovered during ongoing archaeological research at the Salbir by a joint expedition of the ANAS Institute of Archeology and Anthropology and Seoul National University (Korea), led by Jeyhun Eminli from Azerbaijan and Professor Kim Jong-il from South Korea. The newly unearthed building and its extensive yard occupy a vast area within the upper cultural layer of Salbir's southwestern edge. Excavations have revealed numerous building decorations, indicating that the rooms were likely adorned with lime-containing plaster and various ornamental details, with poorly observed colors suggesting further inner wall decorations. Additionally, Muslim graves dating back to the 12th-13th centuries were found within the building.

== See also ==
- Archaeological site of Tava Tepe
- Archaeology of Azerbaijan
- Çuxur Qəbələ
- Archaeological site of Kharabagilan
