= Numismatic Fund of the National Museum of History of Azerbaijan =

Coin collection

The Numismatic Fund of the National Museum of History of Azerbaijan contains more than 100,000 coins that relate to different periods. Mainly these are coins from kingdoms such as Safavids, Shirvanshahs, Kara Koyunlu and Salarids.

The fund also contains coins from Ancient Rome, Arabic Caliphate, Ottoman Empire, Russia, China, Baburids, Sassanids and others.

== History ==
The Numismatic Fund was created in 1920 as part of the National Museum of History of Azerbaijan. The fund initially contained 103 coins.

The numismatic fund was initiated by Yevgeny Pakhomov. Pakhomov was chairman of the fund for 35 years, searching for ancient coins in Azerbaijan and researching their origins. Pakhomov released a series of publications named “Coin treasures of Azerbaijan and other republics, territories, regions of the Caucasus”.

In 1938, the fund’s collection increased to 2,407 coins. Most of these came from the Sassanid Empirea and were found by farmers in Alty-Aghach.

In 1968 the co-author of monograph “Numismatics of Azerbaijan”, Ali Rajably was appointed as chairman of the fund. Ali Rajably published 70 articles about numismatics of Azerbaijan.

In 1975, the fund contained 85 thousand coins and was the biggest numismatic fund in the USSR.

== Collection ==
=== Ancient Greece ===
200 Greek coins were found in 1958 near Shamakhi city. The coins were mainly from Athens and were dated from the reigns of Alexander the Great to Nicomedes II.

Another 593 Greek coins were found in Gabala. Tetradrachms of the kings of Bactria Diodotus and Eucratides were among these discoveries.

In 1972, another 36 Greek coins were found. These coins imitated the coins of Alexander the Great and belonged to an Albanian settlement.

==== Rome ====
In the second half of the 1st century BC, Roman coins were common in Caucasian Albania. Most were found in western Azerbaijan. Most of the coins had a portrait of Emperor August and his grandchildren, Guy and Lucius.

==== Parthian coins ====
Parthian coins appeared in Azerbaijan from the second century BC. Parthian coins have been found both in collections and individually. Mithridates II drachmas (overall 30 instances) were found there. Parthian coins replaced local imitation coins and spread even more than Roman silver coins.

=== Middle Ages ===
==== Sassania ====
Sassanid coins were once common in Azerbaijan. In the twentieth century, more than 100 treasures of various sizes were discovered. The time range of coins is from the fifth through seventh centuries, with the exception of a third century Sassanid treasure, found in village Chukhur-Gabala.

The high prevalence of Sassanid coins is explained by the strengthened military and administrative influence of the Sassanid Empire on caucasian Albania. Even after the fall of the Sassanid Empire, coins Sassanid were circulated in Albania and coins were found in Arabic Caliphate treasuries.

==== Byzantium ====
The first Byzantine coins dated from the reign of Constantine I. Its main locations were southeastern regions of Azerbaijan. Both Byzantine and Sassanid Empire empires tried to influence border surroundings. One of the last Byzantine treasures was found in the seventh century. Due to the Arab invasion, Byzantine coins ceased to flow to Azerbaijan until the tenth century. The youngest Byzantine coin in Azerbaijan belongs to the eleventh century.

==== Caliphate ====
Caliphate coins came to use immediately after Azerbaijan was occupied by the Arabic Caliphate. Mints were located in al-Yazidiyye, Bailakan, Ganja and al-Mutavakkiliye. Names of cities and names of Caliphs appeared in the eighth century.

The youngest Caliphate coin is dated to the eighth century.

== Gallery ==
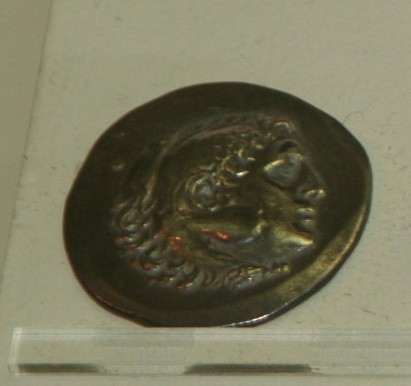
Silver tetradrachm, Macedonia, Alexander III

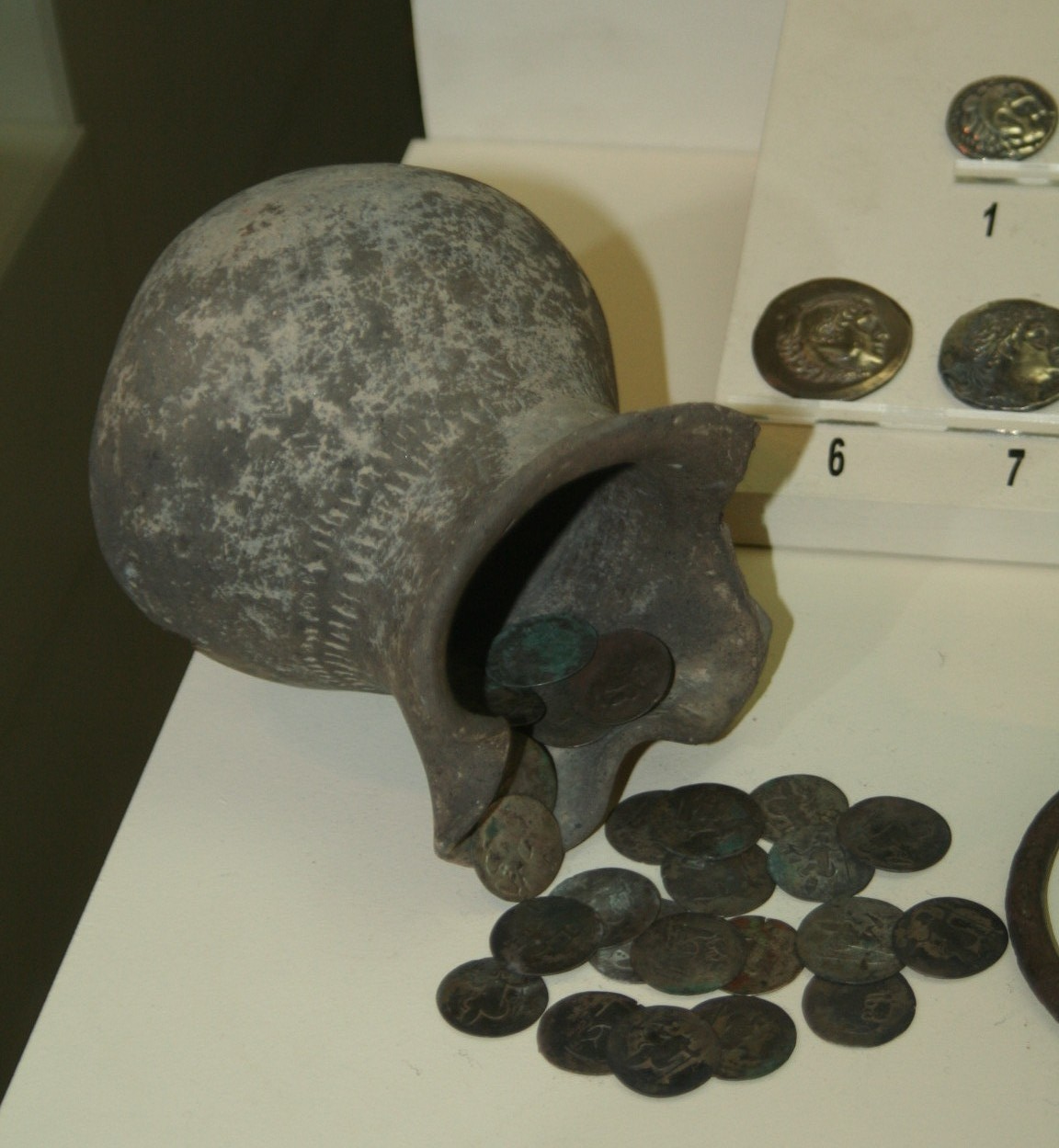
Treasuey from Nuydi with silver coins of Caucasian Albania

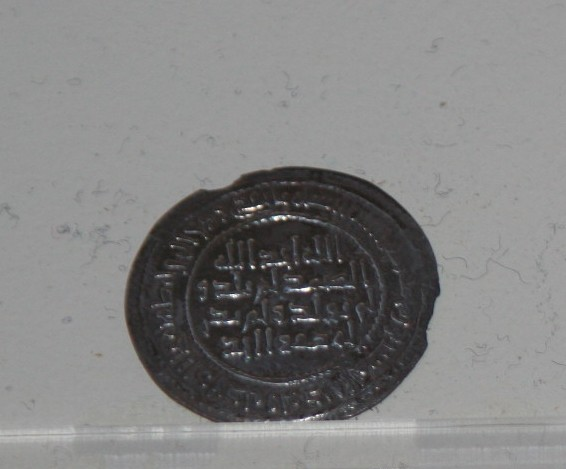
Silver dirham of Umayyads minted in Damascus

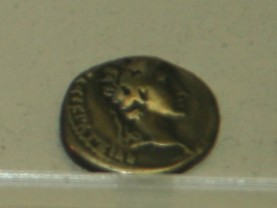
Silver denarius, Roma (empire), Augustus
