= Çalxanqala =

Village and municipality in the Kangarli District of Nakhchivan, Azerbaijan

- Municipality
- Location within Azerbaijan
- Coordinates: 39°26′30″N 45°17′00″E
- Country: Azerbaijan
- Autonomous republic: Nakhchivan
- District: Kangarli

Population (2005)
  - Total: 2,149
- Time zone: UTC+4 (AZT)

Çalxanqala (also Chalkhangala and Chalhankala) is a village and municipality in the Kangarli District of Nakhchivan, Azerbaijan. It is located 33 km in the north-west from the district center, on the south slope of the Daralayaz ridge. Its population is busy with grain-growing, vine-growing, beekeeping and animal husbandry. There are secondary school, music school, library, club and a medical center in the village. It has a population of 2,149. It was the last Armenian-populated town in Nakhchivan.

== Etymology ==
The village named after the Fortress of the Çalxanqala (Chalkhangala) of Bronze Age which built up with large rocks near the village. The name of the Fortress made out from the words of Chalkhan // Chelkan (ethnicity) and gala (building) and means "The Fortress which belongs to the chelkans". It is ethno toponym. The Kəmərdağ mountain where the Fortress is located, also sometimes is called as Çalxaşala (Chalkhashala).

== Çalxanqala Fortress ==
Chalkhangala - is the fortress of the Bronze Age 22 km in the north-west from the Nakhchivan city. It is located near the Payız village, on the right bank of the Jahrichay River, on the high hill. It was built with large rocks without using the fixing solution. There is only an access road to the fortress from the south side. The fortress of the Chalknagala of the Bronze Age which has survived till the present days has the wall with length of 450 m, height 2.5–3 m and width 2,7–3 meters. Presumably, the Chalkhangala was the main defense fortress of the union of the tribes which were formed in the territory of the Nakhchivan, in the 2nd millennium of BC.

== Churches and Monasteries ==
St. Tovma Monastery was a ruinous Armenian monastery located on high ground in the northeastern part of the village. It was completely erased at some point between 2001 and 2011.

St. Hovhannes Church was an Armenian church located southeast of the village. Similar to St. Tovma Monastery, St. Hovhannes was erased at some point between 2001 and 2011.

St. Grigor Church was an Armenian church located in the central part of the village. Similar to St. Tovma Monastery and St. Hovhannes Church, St. Grigor was erased at some point between 2001 and 2011.

St. Hakob Chapel was located northwest of the village and was destroyed at some point between 2001 and 2011.

== See also ==
- St. Tovma Monastery (Chalkhangala)
- St. Grigor Church (Chalkhangala)
- St. Hovhannes Church (Chalkhangala)
