= Alikomektepe =

Archaeological site in Jalilabad District, Azerbaijan

- Əliköməktəpə (Azerbaijani)
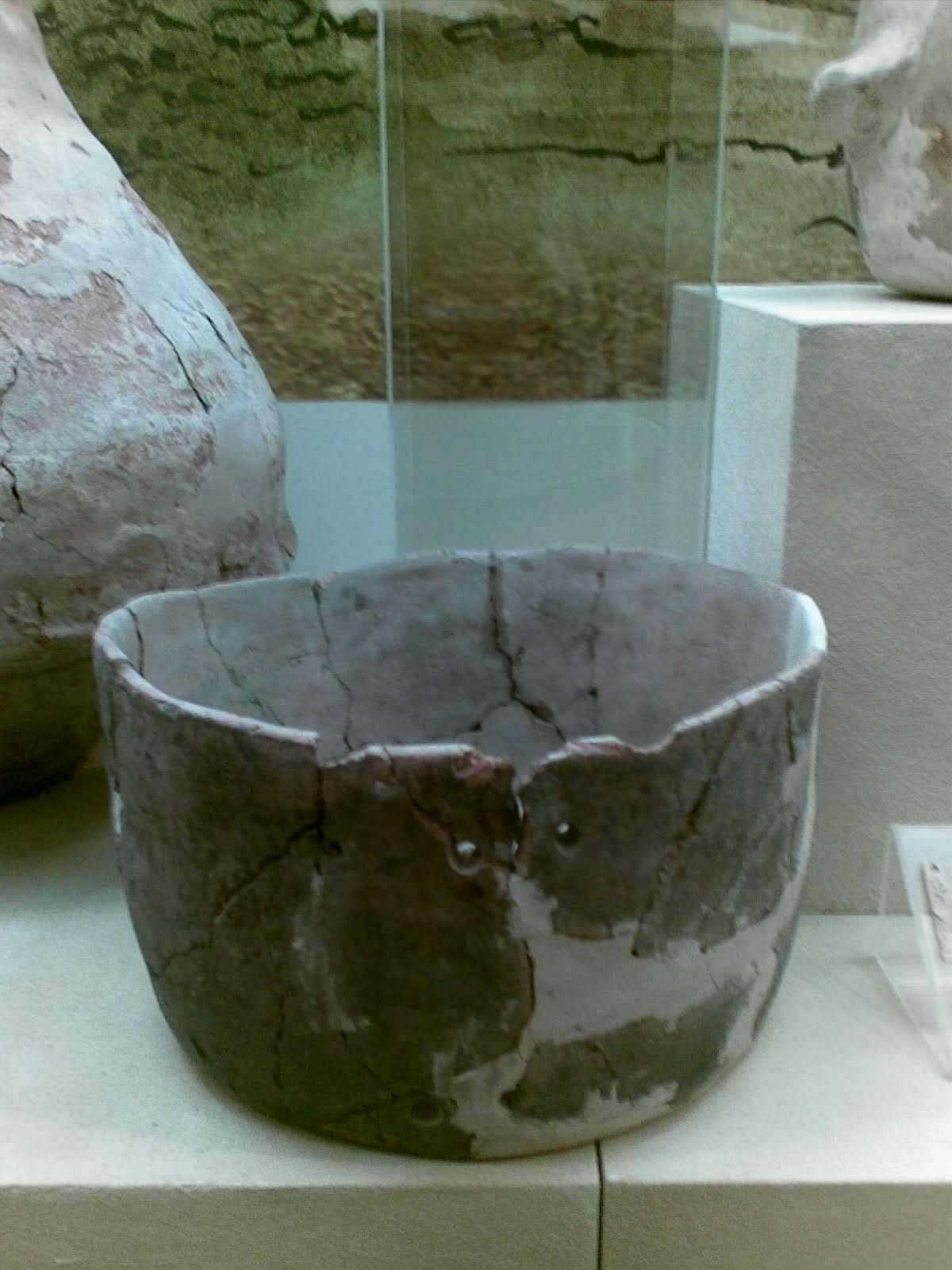
- Ancient pottery from Alikomektepe, c. 5000-4500 BC

- Location within Azerbaijan
- 39.336940°N 48.427500°E
- Periods: Chalcolithic
- Location: Azerbaijan
- Region: Jalilabad District (Azerbaijan)

History
- Built: 5000 BC

Alikomektepe (Azerbaijani: Əliköməktəpə) is an ancient settlement located in Jalilabad District (Azerbaijan), in the Mughan plain, belonging to the Chalcolithic period, dating to c. 5000 BC. Early levels belonged to the Shulaveri–Shomu culture. It covers an area of over 1 hectare.

== Settlement ==
Alikomektepe is located on the right bank of Incechay river, near Uchtepe village of Jalilabad district. The place was excavated in 600 square meters area which belongs to the Eneolithic period. The thickness of the cultural layer is 5.1 m. During the excavation, it was determined that there are six construction layers.

The walls in the lower building layers were built from a series of clay bricks and reinforced with plasters. The buildings on the upper floors of the settlement were square-shaped and built with one or two rows of clay bricks. Outbuildings, or auxiliary buildings, were connected to the houses and connected by a special passage.

The diameter of the round-shaped excavation-type building found on the third construction floor of the settlement was about 3 m. Its walls were whitewashed with lime and decorated with geometrical ornament with red ocher. Ornamental motifs consist of contiguous circle, horseshoe pattern, parallel lines and dots. It is believed that this building was built for the purpose of worship.

Remains of prepared clay balls for pottery-making were found in all construction layers of the settlement.

As a result of archaeological research, two types of domesticated horse bones were discovered in Alikomektepe, which is a great innovation in terms of providing the oldest history of domestication of the horse not only in the Caucasus, but also in the whole Eurasia.

== Historical context ==
Materials from this site are very close to the materials obtained from monuments of northwestern Iran (Dalma ware). The artifacts of the lower level are similar to those at Kültəpə I in Nakhchivan. In the upper levels, there is also pottery of the northern Ubaid period type.

There was numerous earthenware found during the excavations. More than 300 samples of painted pottery covered with monochrome drawings were found. Most of the brown and red drawings are triangles, rhombuses, containing straight and curved lines. Many items from Alikomektepe are considered as locally produced.

== Alikomek–Kultepe culture ==
Some archaeologists speak of the ancient Alikomek–Kultepe culture of southeastern Caucasus, which followed the Shulaveri–Shomu culture, and covered the transition from the Neolithic to Chalcolithic periods (c. 4500 BC).

According to A. Courcier,

"Situated respectively at the border of the Mugan Steppe and in Nakhichevan (Azerbaijan), the settlements of Alikemek and Kul’tepe I were excavated in the 1950s–1970s and are not dated with certainty. They probably represent a relatively long period and occupation seems to have started early (probably during the sixth millennium BCE) (Lyonnet 2008, pp. 4–6). The Alikemek–Kul’tepe culture covered the Ararat Plain, Nakhichevan, the Mil’skoj and Mugan Steppes and the region around Lake Urmia in north-western Iran" (Kushnareva 1997, p. 33).

== See also ==
- History of Azerbaijan
- List of the most important archaeological monuments of Azerbaijan
- Aratashen
- Kul Tepe Jolfa, Iran

== Bibliography ==
- Bertille LYONNET, Farhad GULIYEV (2010), Recent discoveries on the Neolithic and Chalcolithic of Western Azerbaijan. TUBA-AR, TURKISH ACADEMY OF SCIENCES JOURNAL OF ARCHAEOLOGY 13, 219-228
- V Bakhshaliyev, A Seyidov, New findings from the settlement of Sadarak (Nakhchivan-Azerbaijan) - Anatolia Antiqua, 2013 - persee.fr
