= Bakhtiyar Jalilov =

Azerbaijani archaeologist

- Bəxtiyar Məzahim oğlu Cəlilov
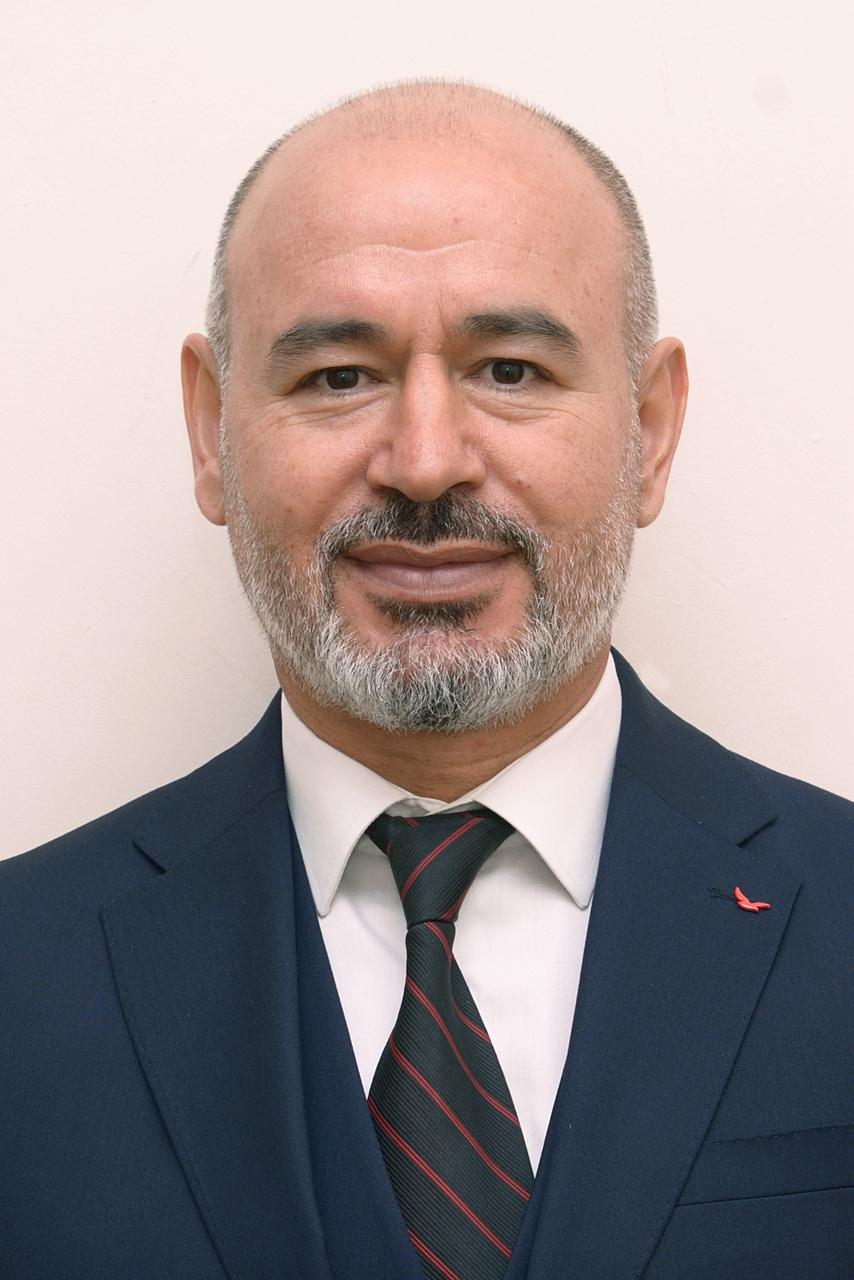
- Born: July 6, 1975 (age 51)
- Citizenship: Azerbaijani
- Occupation: Archaeologist

Academic background
- Education: Azerbaijan State Pedagogical University
- Thesis: Late Bronze Age and Early Iron Age Metallurgy and Metalwork (2007)
- Doctoral advisor: Vali Aliyev

Academic work
- Discipline: Archaeology
- Sub-discipline: Studying and preserving archaeological heritage
- Institutions: Institute of Archaeology and Anthropology of Azerbaijan National Academy of Sciences

Bakhtiyar Jalilov is an Azerbaijani archaeologist and academic specializing in ancient burial practices, funerary architecture, and the conservation of archaeological heritage in Azerbaijan. He serves as an associate professor and head of the Department of Archaeological Research of New Construction Sites at the Institute of Archaeology and Anthropology of the Azerbaijan National Academy of Sciences (ANAS).

== Early life and education ==
Bakhtiyar Jalilov was born in Azerbaijan. He graduated from Azerbaijan State Pedagogical University with a degree in archaeology and later pursued postgraduate studies in the same field. In 2007, he was awarded a Ph.D. in History for his dissertation titled "Late Bronze Age and Early Iron Age Metallurgy and Metalwork."

== Career ==
Bakhtiyar Jalilov began his career at the Institute of Archaeology and Anthropology of the Azerbaijan National Academy of Sciences in 1998. Since then, he has held various research positions and participated in archaeological excavations and fieldwork across Azerbaijan. His research focuses on ancient and medieval burial sites, including rock-cut graves, stone box tombs, and necropolises.

Jalilov has contributed to the documentation and preservation of archaeological heritage and has been involved in the study of kurgans, sanctuaries, and settlements in regions such as Ganja, Goranboy, Dashkasan, and the Agstafa.

== Selected works and publications ==
- (2008) Историко-аналитическая характеристика металла из курганов некрополя Союг булаг и поселения Гейтепе.
- (2011) Могильник эпохи позднего энеолита Cоюг булаг в Aзербайджане.
- (2014) An overview of Kura-Araxes funerary practices in the Southern Caucasus.
- (2014) Metallurgy during the Chalcolithic (5th millennium B.C.) in Azerbaijan: an insight through ancient excavations and recent discoveries.(Mentesh Tepe, Ovcular Tepe).
- (2014) Mentesh Tepe: metallurgical evidence and recent archeometallurgical studies; the beginnings of metallurgy in Azerbaijan in perspective, from the Neolithic to the Early Bronze Age (6th-3rd mill. BCE).
- (2017) Archaeological survey in the territory of Ganja city (2015-2016).
- (2018) The Ancient Metallurgy and Metalworking.
- (2018) The collective burial kurgan of Uzun Rama.
- (2019) GaRKAP 2018: The first season of the Azero-Italian Ganja Region Kurgan Archaeological Project in Western Azerbaijan.
- (2020) Reconstructing funerary sequences of kurgans in the southern Caucasus: the first two seasons of the Azerbaijan-Italian Ganja Kurgan Archaeological Region Project (GaRKAP) in western Azerbaijan.
- (2021) Geochemistry of gold from the prehistoric mine of Sakdrisi and Transcaucasian gold artefacts between the 4th and 2nd millennia BC On salt, copper and gold: The origins of early mining and metallurgy in the Caucasus.
- (2021) Research conducted in Chovdar in 2021 XVl.
- (2021) New Burial Traditions and Early Kurgan Cultures in Late Chalcolithic and Early Bronze Age Azerbaijan.
- (2022) Emergence and intensification of dairying in the Caucasus and Eurasian steppes.
- (2023) Preliminary X-ray Fluorescence Analysis of Metallic Samples from the Chovdar Necropolis in Azerbaijan.
- (2023) A Preliminary Report on a Mid-Late Fourth Millennium BC Kurgan in Western Azerbaijan.
- (2023) Combined geophysical prospection of kurgans on the Uzun Rama plateau in the Caucasus, Azerbaijan: first results.
- (2024) Preliminary Results of the excavaions at Qarachinar (Azerbaijan) and New Data on the "Kur Arexes Early Kurgans" Transition on the Eastern Piedmont of the Lesser Caucasus.
- (2024) Kurgan Phenomenon in the Southern Caucasus: Results of an Interdisciplinary Multi‐Method Remote Sensing Survey Along the Kurekçay Valley (Goranboy Province, Western Azerbaijan).

== See also ==
- Archaeological site of Tava Tepe
- Early Bronze Age in Azerbaijan
- Archaeology of Azerbaijan
