= Mehrəlliqışlaq =

Human settlement in Azerbaijan

Mehrəlliqışlaq is a village in the municipality of Canaxır in the Khachmaz Rayon of Azerbaijan.
