= St. Hovhannes Church (Chalkhangala) =

Armenian church in the Nakhchivan Autonomous Republic of Azerbaijan

St. Hovhannes Church of Aznaberd
- Ազնաբերդի Ս. Հովհաննես եկեղեցի
- St. Hovhannes Church of Aznaberd
- Location: Çalxanqala
- Country: Azerbaijan
- Denomination: Armenian Apostolic Church

History
- Status: Destroyed
- Founded: 12th or 13th century

Architecture
- Demolished: 2001–2011

St. Hovhannes Church was an Armenian church located in village of Chalkhangala (Kangarli District) of the Nakhchivan Autonomous Republic of Azerbaijan. It was located southeast of the village.

== History ==
The church was founded in the 12th or 13th century and was renovated in 1651 and in the 19th century.

== Architecture ==
The church was a single-nave structure with vaulted hall, a semicircular apse, and an entrance on the northern facade. There were Armenian inscriptions on the northern facade, and ornamentation on the bema.

== Destruction ==
The church was still extant in 2001, however, it was destroyed at some point between August 30, 2001, and July 15, 2011, as documented by Caucasus Heritage Watch.

== See also ==
- St. Tovma Monastery (Chalkhangala)
- St. Grigor Church (Chalkhangala)
