= Qırx Çıraq =

Coordinates: 39.6444°N 48.9752°E

Qırx Çıraq is a village in the municipality of Çuxanlı in the Salyan Rayon of Azerbaijan.
