= St. Grigor Church (Chalkhangala) =

Armenian church in the Nakhchivan Autonomous Republic of Azerbaijan

St. Grigor Church of Aznaberd
- Ազնաբերդի Ս. Գրիգոր եկեղեցի
- St. Grigor Church of Aznaberd
- Location: Çalxanqala
- Country: Azerbaijan
- Denomination: Armenian Apostolic Church

History
- Status: Destroyed
- Founded: 12th or 13th century

Architecture
- Style: Basilica
- Demolished: 2001–2011

St. Grigor Church was an Armenian church located in the village of Chalkhangala (Kangarli District) of the Nakhchivan Autonomous Republic of Azerbaijan. The church was located in the central part of the village.

== History ==
The church was founded in the 12th or 13th century. It was rebuilt in the second half of the 16th century.

== Architecture ==
St. Grigor was a basilica-style church consisting of a nave and two aisles, a pentagonal apse, and two vestries, with doorways on the western and southern facades. There were Armenian inscriptions in the interior and on the southern and western facades. As of 1979 part of the roof had collapsed and there were cracks in the walls.

== Destruction ==
The church was still extant in the late Soviet period (the 1980s). However, it has been destroyed in the period between August 30, 2001, and July 15, 2011, as documented by Caucasus Heritage Watch.

== See also ==
- St. Tovma Monastery (Chalkhangala)
- St. Hovhannes Church (Chalkhangala)
