= St. Tovma Monastery (Chalkhangala) =

Ruined Armenian monastery in the Nakhchivan Autonomous Republic of Azerbaijan

- Սբ. Թովմա վանք
- St. Tovma Monastery
- Location: Çalxanqala
- Country: Azerbaijan
- Denomination: Armenian Apostolic Church

History
- Status: destroyed
- Founded: 10th to 12th centuries

Architecture
- Demolished: 2001–2011

St. Tovma Monastery was a ruined Armenian monastery located in the village of Chalkhangala (Kangarli District) of the Nakhchivan Autonomous Republic of Azerbaijan. The monastery was located on high ground in the northeastern part of the village.

== History ==
The monastery was founded in the 10th to 12th centuries and was renovated in the 17th century.

The monastery was in ruins in the later Soviet period; the roof and upper walls were destroyed, but it was possible to discern the overall plan of the building, with a vaulted hall, semicircular apse, and doorway in the south.

The remains of the monastery were still extant on August 30, 2001, however, by July 15, 2011, the monastery had been erased, as documented by Caucasus Heritage Watch.

== See also ==
- St. Grigor Church (Chalkhangala)
- St. Hovhannes Church (Chalkhangala)
