= Canaxır =

- Municipality
- Location within Azerbaijan
- Coordinates: 41°25′N 48°49′E
- Country: Azerbaijan
- Rayon: Khachmaz
- Time zone: UTC+4 (AZT)
  - Summer (DST): UTC+5 (AZT)

Canaxır (also, Dzha nakhar and Dzhanak hyr) is a village and municipality in the Khachmaz Rayon of Azerbaijan. The municipality consists of the villages of Canaxır, Bəyqışlaq, and Mehrəlliqışlaq.
