= Yurdçu =

- Municipality
- Location within Azerbaijan
- Coordinates: 39°24′24″N 45°09′06″E
- Country: Azerbaijan
- Autonomous republic: Nakhchivan
- District: Kangarli

Population (2005)
  - Total: 1,085
- Time zone: UTC+4 (AZT)

Yurdçu (also, Yurdchu and Yurtchi) is a village and municipality in the Kangarli District of Nakhchivan, Azerbaijan. It is located 25 km in the south-east from the district center, on the slope of the Daralayaz ridge. Its population is busy with farming and animal husbandry. There are secondary school, club and a medical center in the village. It has a population of 1,085. There are the settlements of the first Iron Age and Middle Ages, the treasure of coins of the different periods, the burial mounds of the ancient period, the necropolis of the Bronze and Early Iron Age in the nearby of the village.

== Etymology ==
Yurdchu village is located at the foot of the Daralayaz ridge. The name of the Yurdchu is related with the name of the yurdchu tribe, one of the arms of the Turkic Kengerli tribe. In the past, the several villages in the Nakhchivan were founded by the tribe of Yurdchu.

== Yurdchu ==
Yurdchu - the settlement of the first Iron Age from the south-west of the Yurdchu village, in the Kangarli region. The area is 2 ha. Settlement was recorded in 1983. Overground findings which is consist from the fractures of the clay pots and stone tools is divided into two periods. The pottery wares and labor tools which is the specific to the first Iron Age belongs to the first period. The overground materials which were founded during the searches has consist from the grain stone and the fragments of clay pots of pink and gray colored. It is supposed that the settlement of the Yurdchu belongs to the 10th-8th centuries BC.

== Treasure of Yurdchu ==
Treasure of Yurdchu - the treasure of silver and copper coins of the different periods which was found from the same named village, in the Kengerli District. The 328 of the coins has been studied at the Institute of Archeology and Ethnography of Azerbaijan National Academy of Sciences. Most ancient is the cut dirham on behalf of the John I Tzimiskes [969-976] of the emperor of the Byzantine Empire. Inside the treasure of the Yurdchu have the dirhams which were cut on behalf of the Sultans of the Seljuk Empire, Togrul II (1132–1135), Masud (1135–1152), Arslan-Shah (1160–1176). Most of the coins of the treasure were cut on behalf of the rulers of the Atabay state. Treasure of the Yurdchu is important for to the study the economic and political history of the Nakhchivan.
