= Aşağı Kəsəmən =

- Municipality
- Location within Azerbaijan
- Coordinates: 41°09′06″N 45°29′27″E
- Country: Azerbaijan
- Rayon: Agstafa
- Elevation: 312 m (1,024 ft)

Population (2009)
  - Total: 2,706
- Time zone: UTC+4 (AZT)
  - Summer (DST): UTC+5 (AZT)

Aşağı Kəsəmən (also, İskra, Yenikänd, Yenikend, and Yerikend) is a village and municipality in the Agstafa Rayon of Azerbaijan. It has a population of 2,596.
