= Archaeological site of Tava Tepe =

Tava Tepe is an archaeological site located in the Aghstafa District of western Azerbaijan. It covers an area of approximately 3.3 hectares and is situated a few kilometers west of the Kura River valley, near the modern village of Aşağı Kəsəmən. Tava Tepe, dating to the Late Bronze–Early Iron Age, was a settlement site of tribes associated with the Khojaly-Gadabay culture.

Recent discoveries at Tava Tepe have provided new insights into the dietary habits of its inhabitants and support the interpretation that the site was used for ritual gatherings involving communal meals among nomadic groups.

== Archaeology ==
Initial excavations were conducted by The Tava Tepe Archaeological Project led by CAMNES (Center for Ancient Mediterranean and Near Eastern Studies), the University of Catania, and ANAS (Azerbaijan National Academy of Sciences) in 2021. The Tava Tepe Archaeological Project is part of the broader Ganja Region Kurgan Archaeological Project (GaRKAP). The scientific coordination of both initiatives is jointly led by Nicola Laneri from CAMNES and Bakhtiyar Jalilov from ANAS.

The aim of these investigations was to uncover archaeological evidence from Phase I (Bronze Age) and Phase II (Iron Age).

In July 2024, a team of archaeologists uncovered a 3,500-year-old ritual table, accompanied by ceramic tableware still in place. According to researchers, Tava Tepe features a concentric-circle earthen structure with a central kitchen area, hearth installations, and evidence of communal feasting which is suggesting its use as a ceremonial resting place for nomadic tribes traveling between the Kura River basin and the Caucasus Mountains.

Burn marks, together with scattered fragments of black burnished ceramic bowls and glasses, point to on-site cooking activities, most likely within ceramic vessels. The researchers noted that the structure once had a monumental entrance framed by wooden columns and covered by a thatched roof, which may have extended over the entire area; numerous post holes arranged in a circle suggest the structure spanned about 15 meters in diameter. Around the outer edge of this circular layout, an accumulation of animal bones including those from cattle, sheep, and pigs was uncovered, alongside broken pottery.

== See also ==
- Çovdar, Dashkasan
- Goytepe archaeological complex
- Bakhtiyar Jalilov
