= Yazdegerd Castle, Nakhchivan =

Pre-medieval castle in Azerbaijan

Yazdegerd Castle
- Yezidabad qalası (Azerbaijani)
- Nakhchivangala
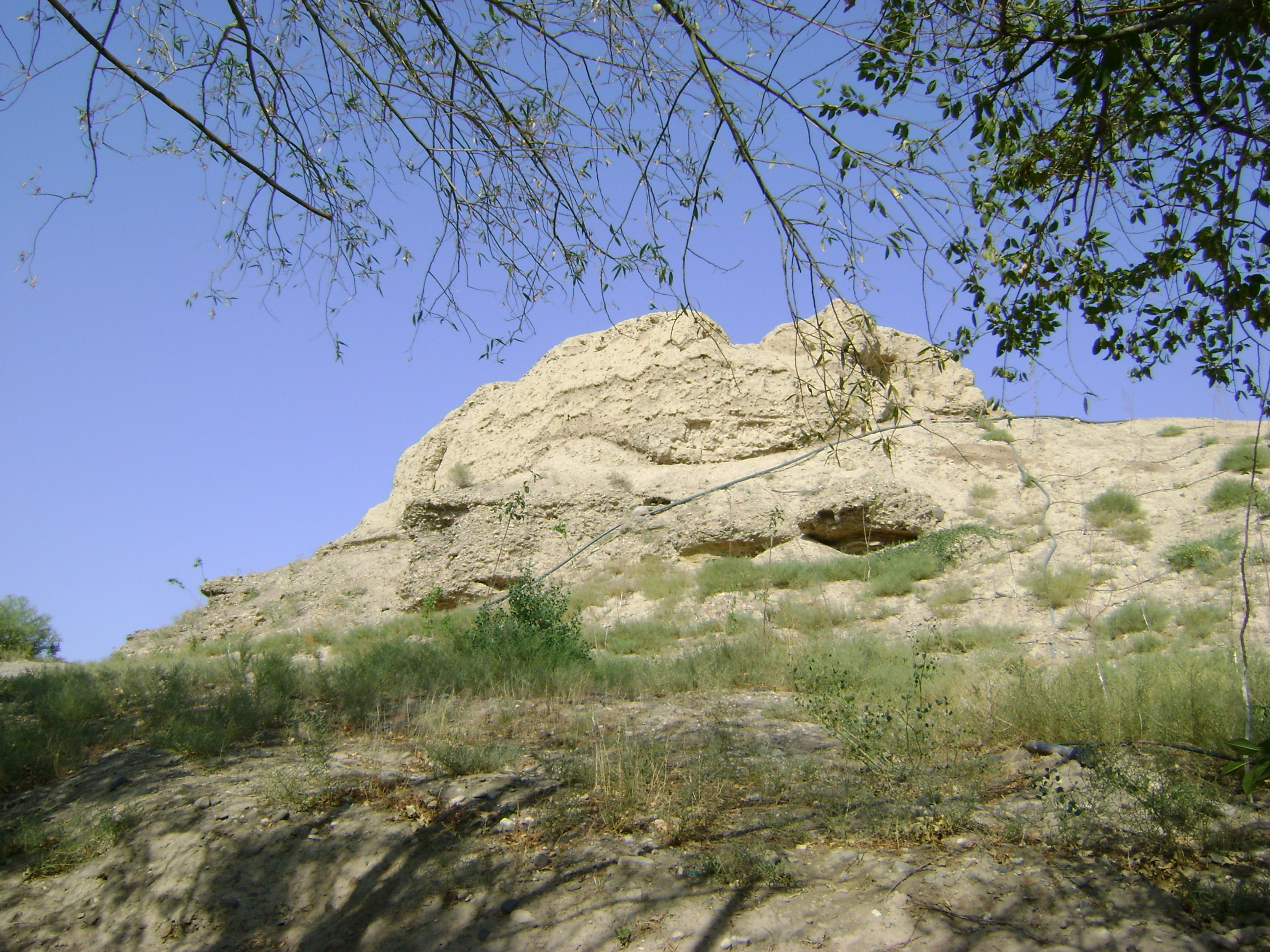
- Fortress walls
- Interactive map of Yazdegerd Castle
- 39.1971°N 45.4124°E
- Type: Castle
- Location: 5CW6+QGH; Nakhchivan, Azerbaijan

History
- Built: 7th century

Site notes
- Restored: 2013

The Yazdegerd Castle is a pre-medieval Sassanid castle in Nakhchivan, Azerbaijan. It is constructed solely of mud. The castle is named after the last Sassanid king, Yazdegerd III (632–651).

Outside of scientific circles the castle is commonly known as Nakhchivangala or Kohnagala. It currently houses a museum.
