= Uzerliktapa =

- Üzərliktəpə (Azerbaijani)
- Location within Azerbaijan
- 39°59′01″N 46°55′43″E
- Type: Settlement
- Periods: Middle Bronze Age
- Location: Aghdam, Azerbaijan
- Region: Caucasus

Site notes
- Height: 6–7 m (20–23 ft)
- Area: 3 ha (7.4 acres)
- Archaeologists: A.A. Gessen
- Condition: unknown

Uzerliktapa — is a middle Bronze Age settlement near the city of Aghdam. The cultural layer was approximately 3.5 m high at the end of the 2nd millennium BC. The Uzerliktapa settlement is one of the rare monuments of the city's first urban culture.

== The first urban settlements in the Caucasus ==
The highway has partially cut down the current highway from Aghdam to Agjabadi. The western part of the hill is now cemetery.

In 1954, this hill attracted the attention of many Azerbaijani and Russian scholars. The most interesting thing is that this hill is not artificially created as a mound. That is, it is a natural hill. On the other hand, many material and cultural remains of 3-4 thousand years ago have been collected by the traveler in the destroyed part of this natural hill. Of course, it is the fate of this mysterious hill, the most thoughtful of scholars, how the find could fall to the middle of the hill and how many other fossils would be found on the hill. Among the scholars there were also controversial. Some claim that he was a cemetery from the earliest times, while others claimed to be a hilltop.

In order to put an end to all these disputes, St. Petersburg scientist A.A. Gessen suggested to do excavation on the hill. One of the reasons for excavation was that in the 1950s, the Bronze Age settlements in Karabakh had not been studied. Therefore, the nature of the settlements 3-4 thousand years ago, their habitation, the structure of their homes, the type of building materials, etc. The study of such monuments was of great importance for learning. Only living places could help to learn the level of material and spiritual life of the population.

The only ancient settlement in the archeological excavation of the Millard is Uzerliktapa. This monument is located in a geographically favourable position in the east from the city of Aghdam. The residence has an oval plan which is incorrect. Its widest range from north to south is 202 m. Archaeological excavations were carried out on 484 m2 area. The thickness of the cultural layer on the natural hill is 3 m.

During the archeological excavations, 3 construction layers were discovered. The first construction layer is characterised by the presence of various types of workshops. Some of them are full of kitchenware and ash. It has been used to store animals from straw piles. Remains of this building have been found on this layer. Its walls are woven from thick sticks and dipped into clay. The roof of the building is covered with wooden shells, and the ground floor is covered with a mat. Clay bottles on the floor, clay stoves were found inside the scattered hearth. Frosted metal alloy was found inside the clay bush found in the oven. Teas, lugs and stone molds from tea stones were obtained near the quarry. This house was painted by K. Kushnareva as a "cast house". Clay items found in this layer are divided into two groups, kitchen and household utensils. Ceramic products are cooked in gray or black color. Household appliances are thoroughly polished. The boards are designed with various motifs of gray ornaments.

The thickness of the middle layer selected by rich oak residues, economic wells and rich archeological materials is 1.5 m. The ruins of the magnificent protective wall, which depicts the entire habitat, have been discovered on this layer. The wall of the protective wall is 35 m in length and 3 m in width and 1 m in height. One of its entrance doors is reinforced with counterfeit. Remnants of ground-based and wood-covered houses were found on the inside of the defensive wall. During this period, the place of residence was exposed to a double fire. As a result of the collapse of the houses and the accumulation of the cultural layer, the defense wall has lost its significance and has been calibrated.

The third building period was located on the wall of the defense. In spite of the fact that it was extremely bad, the ground floor and the household items kept on them were found on this layer. Ceramics of the second and third classes were accepted by K. Kushnaryeva as a single complex. During this period, there was considerable progress in the production of clay products. The sculptural ornament used in the substrate was replaced by a more perfect ornament. During this period, painted containers, which are completely different from the black colored ceramics of Oterliktepe, appear. K. Kushnaryeva links the formation of the painted containers with the progress made in the development of pottery.

Monochrome painted dishes, differing from the black polished ceramic, reflect the effect of another culture and will be further explained below. At the moment, it can be said that this culture can be considered as evidence of the progress of the painted vessels to the north of the Nakhchivan-Urmia Basin. Very few (2%) of the painted containers inside the clay products confirm that this is the case.

== The protection of the inhabitants of the Uzerliktapa ==
In 1954 archeological excavations began in Uzeriktapa. As a result of the excavations, it was discovered that at about 6–7 m, the Uzerliktapa was approximately 3.5 m high at the end of the 2nd millennium BC. At that time local residents had settled down on the Upper East. It is interesting that, as in all of Azerbaijan, the ancient inhabitants of Karabakh used mainly the tall hills when selecting their dwelling places during the tribal period. This is only a military objective. During the tribal battles with harsh methods, the hills were able to see the enemy forces faster and to prepare emergency response measures. On the other hand, a deep trench was dug around the hill that had a compact area. These trenchers played a role in the danger. Sometimes, they filled the trench with water, turning the hill into a kind of island. The fortress was one of the most fortified settlements in the surrounding wall. In fact, the Uzerliktepe settlement, which had collapsed during the period of the primitive community and where property inequality occurred, was one of the rare monuments reflecting the city culture.

As a result of the excavations it has been discovered that Uzerliktapa has been inhabited for many centuries, and as a result of this habitat, a three-meter-long cultural layer has emerged. Archaeological observations of the cultural layer revealed that the habitation period Uzerliktapa was continued 2000 year.

One of the main heritages that attracted attention during excavations was the remains of a large volume of bricks. It is known that this wall surrounded the upper part of the hill roundly. Scholars have rightly ruled that this wall is a defensive fortress. Thus, the residents of the Upper East, apparently, took every effort to protect themselves from enemy attacks. The ruins of the semi-permanent dwelling houses, the hearths, the trench used for various purposes, the farming tools, clay trays and clay figures were found inside that fortress wall. Residential houses in Uzerliktapa are mainly built of bricks. The floor of the houses is smoothly watered with clay. Each house has cobblestone holes. In addition, many holes were built inside the dwellings, and sometimes in the yard. According to researchers, these pits, which are of different sizes, are often used to store food and, in a few cases, for the garbage cans.

== Agriculture ==
A number of remnants of the ancient culture of the ancient inhabitants of Karabakh have been discovered. Many of the hollows and houseplants, as well as wheat and barley remains were found in clay vessels. After laboratory analysis it became clear that the remains of this wheat were cultivated 4-5 thousand years ago by cultivation. In addition, wheat and barley were grown together in most cases. It also proves that the stone tool used in the harvesting of the planted grain was found. The stone sickle cuts the smaller stones and equips them to the jawbone of the large horned beetle. One side of stone pieces that are considered to be teeth of the field is stinging with stone. Stone tools in the life of the inhabitants of the Far East have taken a major place. Here, stone-made arrows, stone blades, many pagan battles, and grasshoppers were discovered. In addition, stones from scarves, scales, ornaments or breasts, playing roles, etc. It has been established that all these 3-4 thousand years ago still show that stone tools play a major role in the lives of indigenous people. The sting was also plucked by stones. To do so, they took a piece of solid rock and thinned one end of it. The stomach of the stone is well-suited to the tree. These tissues were found in Rasultapa, another settlement near Aghdam.

One of the great finds is the remains of grape seeds, which proves that gardening has an ancient history in that area. The role of bone instruments in the lives of the ancient residents has also been minimal. They made needles for knitting machines and needles for sewing. The same items are made of bronze made of copper and copper. Acquired weapons, knives and so on. it is also from the bronze. As a result of the excavations conducted in Uzerliktapa, ancient inhabitants of Karabakh were known 4.5 thousand years ago for the mystery of solid metal, 3 thousand years before the mystery of iron production.

== Craftsmanship and livestock farming ==
Beside agriculture, livestock has also taken a major place. Imagination about the illness and its species creates numerous animal bones found in that monument. As a result of laboratory analyses carried out by our scientists, the affinity of the Beetle's identified animal bones has been fully understood. Only 464 units of bull bones, 285 sheep and goat bones, 40 parts of horse bones, 104 pork bones and 6 part dogs were discovered here. As a result of the surveys, residents of the Upper Cretaceous used 15 seasonal forms of migration. They had developed livestock breeding in the summer, moving to the mountains in the summer and moving to the winter in order to provide the animals with pastures.

Other archaeological finds show that domestic craftsmanship, along with farming and cattle, is also evolving. Weaving, painting, pottery and metalworking have become more popular in home art. Along with these, the ancient inhabitants of the Far East achieved significant successes in the development of fine arts items. Bracelets, earrings, various beads, breasts, etc., made of metal, bone, agate and pasta. are currently the best exhibits of our museums.

During the excavations in 1965, a pelican was found in Uzerliktapa, a "moving pitcher", that is, made of clay and able to move from one place to another. Clay containers are particularly clustered in the remains of material culture discovered here. It is interesting that, unlike clay vessels found in Khojaly cemetery, the dishes of the residents of the Uzerliktapa are quite diverse. From here you can see a carpenter, a helmet, a teddy bear, a river, different sized boxes and so on. more detected. However, the biggest progress was that they were already aware of the secrets of colouring the plants, and painted many of the 14 clays they used in the household. For this purpose, they mainly used two colors - black and red.

== Religious ideology in the Uzerliktapa ==
Another discovery discovered in science is extremely interesting from the scientific point of view and is of great importance for the study of the religious ideology of the residents. This finding is female. The idol found in the stonework made of stone in the upper layer proves that idolatry has spread among the local population. This religious belief, which was generally observed in the territory of Azerbaijan during the Eneolithic period, later developed a dominant role in the ancient times. During this period, the majority of female idols have come from the idea that the mother is a symbol of heresy or the origin of life.

== Reasons for the abandonment ==
Archaeologists have discovered that the settlement was cut at the end of the first millennium BC. How did it happen that people left this hill where they lived for centuries? It is known that life in Durartapa was cut after a powerful fire there. Archaeologists have said that the burnt remains of the burnt utensils, the thick ash layer formed of that fire, had come to the fore. The cause of this fire is that researchers see the result of external attacks. Thus, at the end of the first millennium BC, the history of the Ottoman Empire was abolished.

Despite being destroyed by fire, the material cultural remains found among its ashes, allowing the ancient inhabitants of Karabakh to have a great culture, a thorough economic field and an ideological view of their own time, as well as in Azerbaijan and in all Transcaucasia one of the richest monuments.
