= Zazalı =

- Municipality
- Location within Azerbaijan
- Coordinates: 40°43′05″N 46°28′25″E
- Country: Azerbaijan
- Rayon: Samukh

Population
  - Total: 579
- Time zone: UTC+4 (AZT)

Zazalı (also, Zazaly) is a village and municipality in the Samukh Rayon of Azerbaijan. It has a population of 579.
