= Kharabagilan =

Ruins of medieval city in Azerbaijan

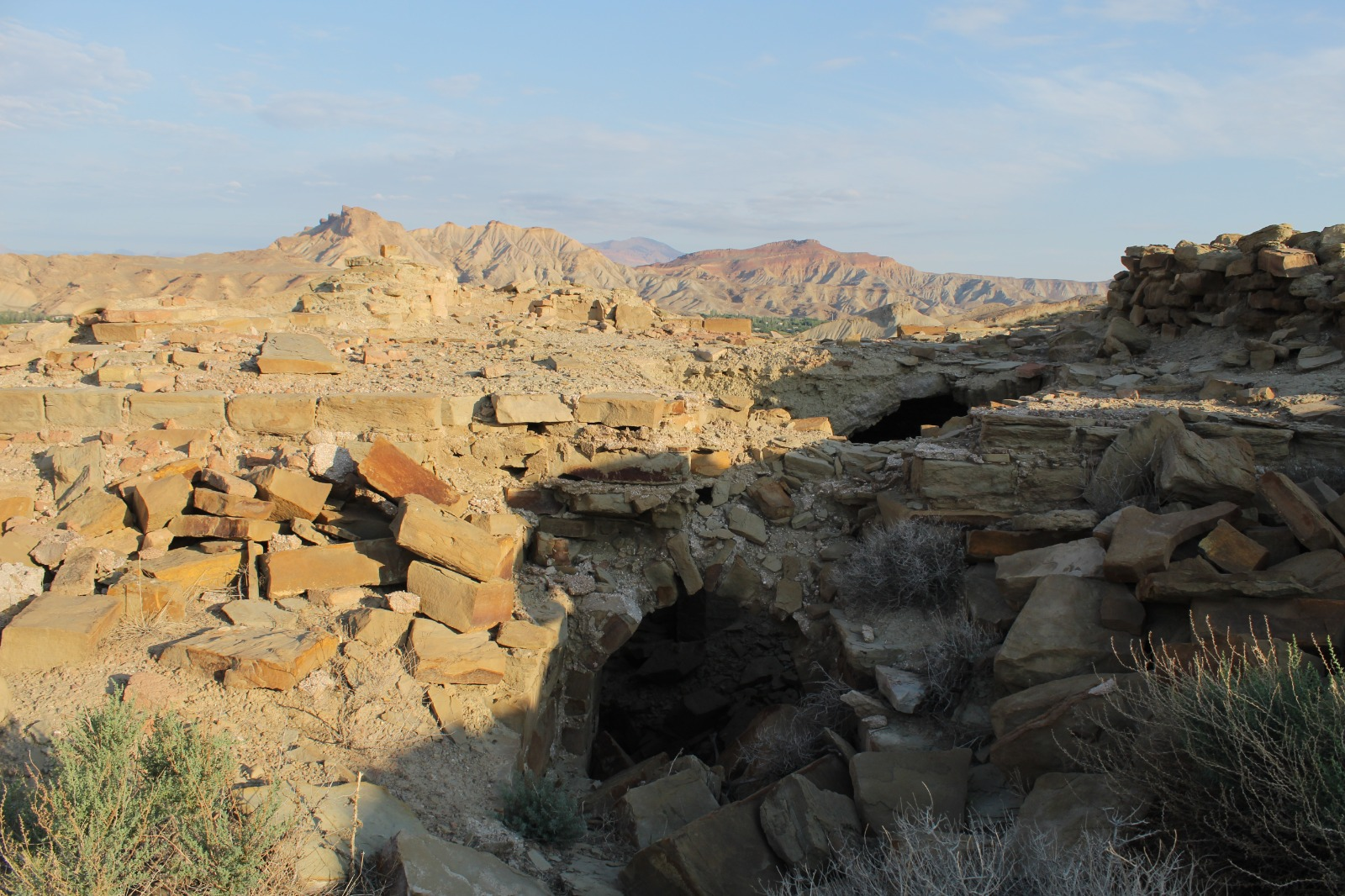
Xaraba Gilan, First Memorial Complex, Remains of Tomb No.1, 12th-13th centuries

Kharabagilan (Azerbaijani: Xarabagilan) is an archaeological site and the ruins of a medieval city located near the village of Kalantar Dize in the Ordubad District of the Nakhchivan Autonomous Republic, Azerbaijan. Situated on the left bank of the Gilanchay River, the site was once an important urban center for the Gilan province. Although the exact date of the earliest settlement in the area is unknown, the Munjuglutepe necropolis, located near the monument, dates to the 9th–4th centuries BC.

== History of research ==
The study of Xarabagilan began at the end of the 19th century. The first archaeological research in the territory of Xarabagilan began in 1913. During excavations in 1926, several graves were discovered and studied in the territory of the monument. Also, copper and iron products, fragments of pottery vessels with Arabic inscriptions, pottery fragments, ceramic water pipes, textile remains, and other artifacts were discovered and transferred to the National Museum of History of Azerbaijan.

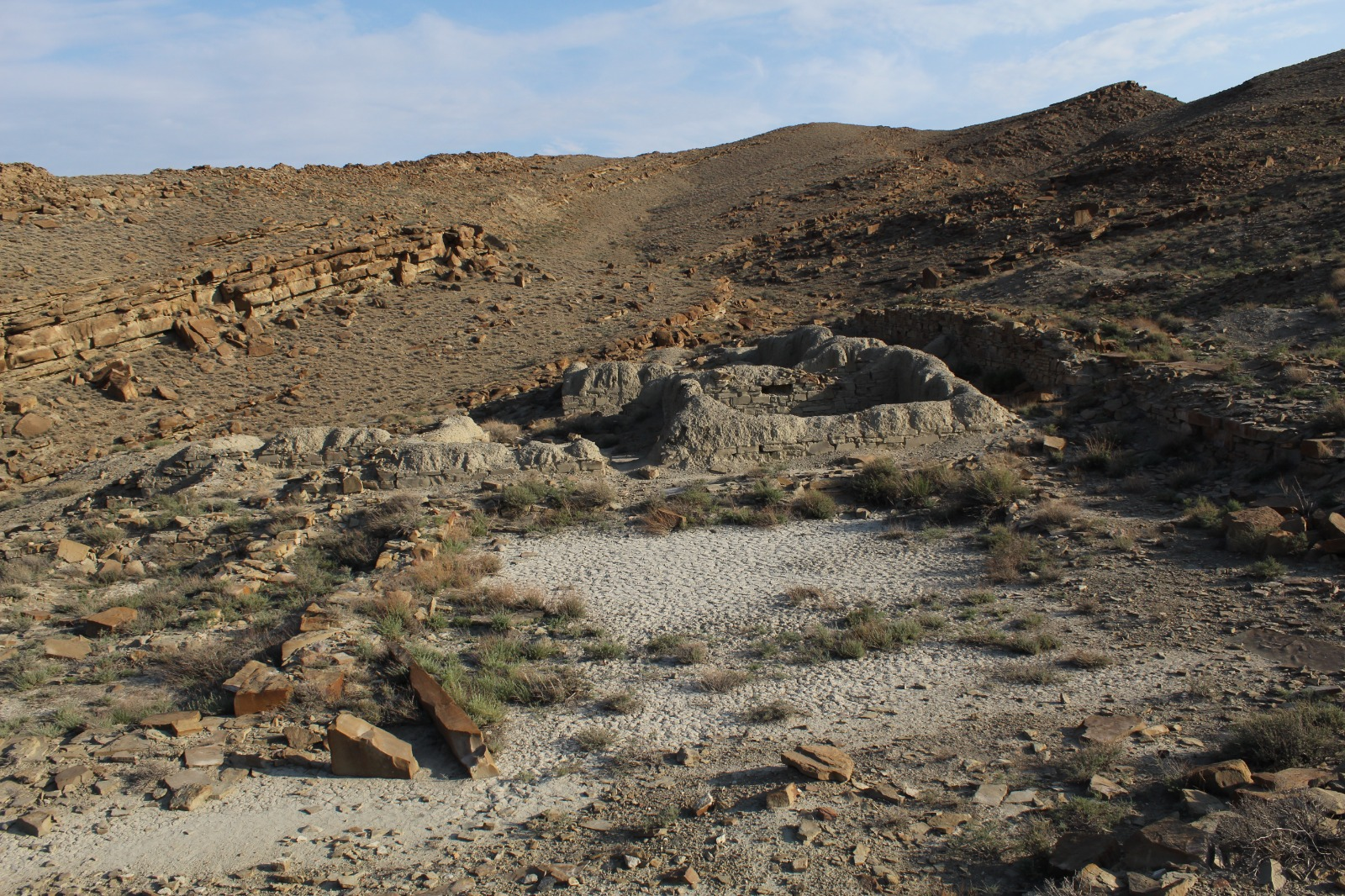
Remains of the Caravanserai

== Archaeological finds ==
The systematic archaeological study of the Xarabagilan settlement was initiated in 1976 by the Xarabagilan detachment of the Nakhchivan archaeological expedition led by V. G. Aliyev. The expedition started the excavations from the northeastern part of the city. As a result of the excavations, the Kiran caravanserai was discovered and its northern side was cleared. The thickness of the cultural layer in the first excavation area was determined to be 2 meters. The study of the stratigraphy of the monument was one of the main goals of the expedition. The architectural style of the buildings and the stylistic analysis of the large number of artifacts recovered allowed researchers to date the discovered complex to the 12th–13th centuries.

In 1977, excavations were carried out in the second quarter of the city near the citadel. As a result of these excavations, residential buildings were uncovered and cleaned. In 1978, as a result of the expansion of excavations in the same area, seven more rooms of the house and a stone staircase leading to the second floor, three tandoors and an entrance arch were discovered. As a result of the study of the stratigraphy of the monument, it was determined that the first cultural layer belongs to the 13th–14th centuries, and the lowest cultural layer to the 9th–12th centuries. The stratigraphic data is also confirmed by the characteristics of coins and pottery found in the monument area.

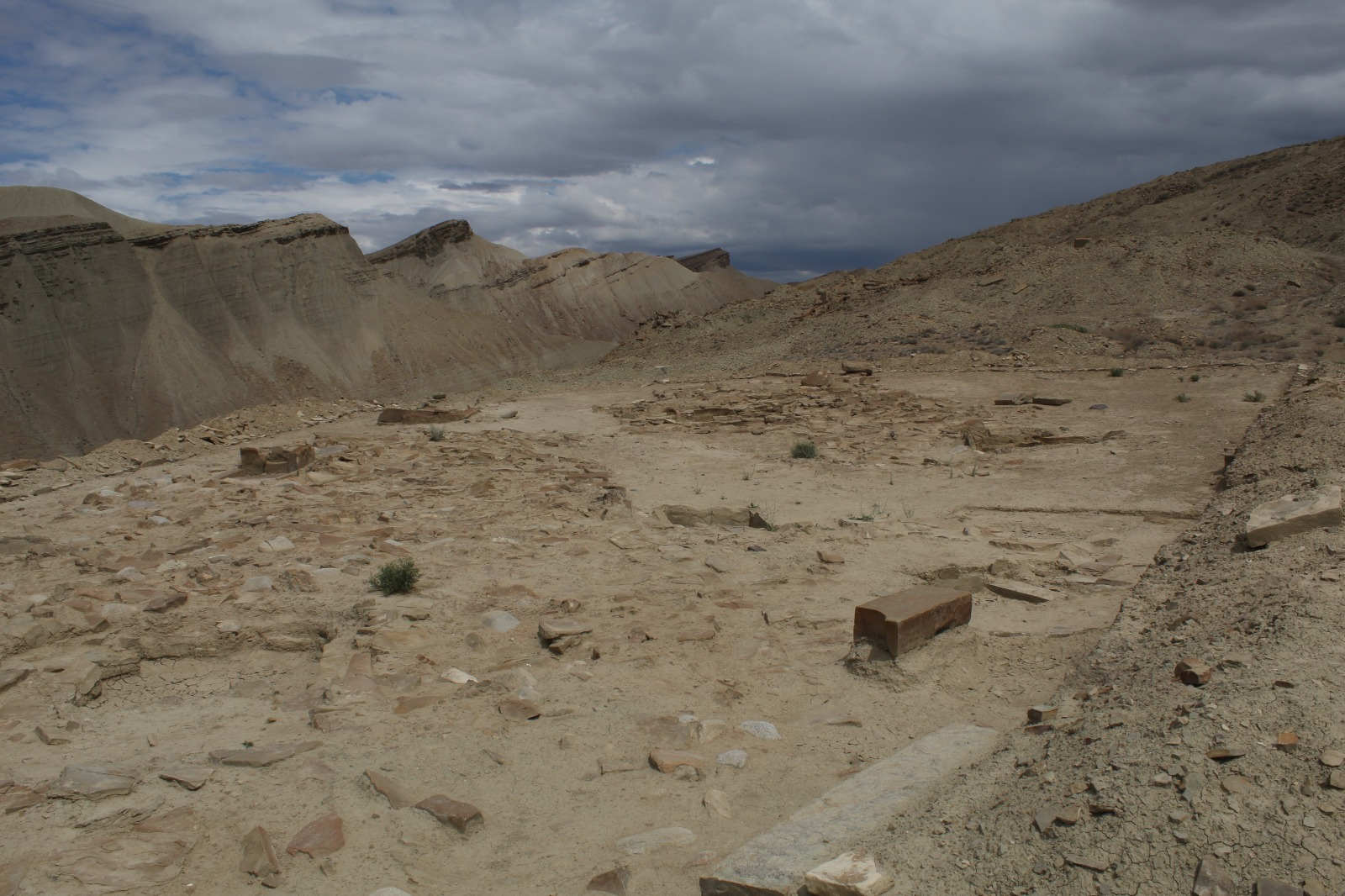
Mardangol necropolis

In 1980, the Xarabagilan expedition, organized by the Institute of History of the ANAS and led by G. M. Aslanov, began excavations in the city. The expedition members excavated in the city center of Xarabagilan and in the nearby Munjuglutape necropolis. In total, 5,000 m2 of the medieval city was excavated. As a result of these studies, a large number of residential buildings, tombs, and caravanserais were discovered and cleaned. The Ancient Near Eastern style seal and dagger, as well as characteristic ceramic vessels discovered by the expedition in the Munjuglutape necropolis, shed light to study the cultural layer of Xarabagilan dating back to the 6th–4th and 9th–6th centuries BC.

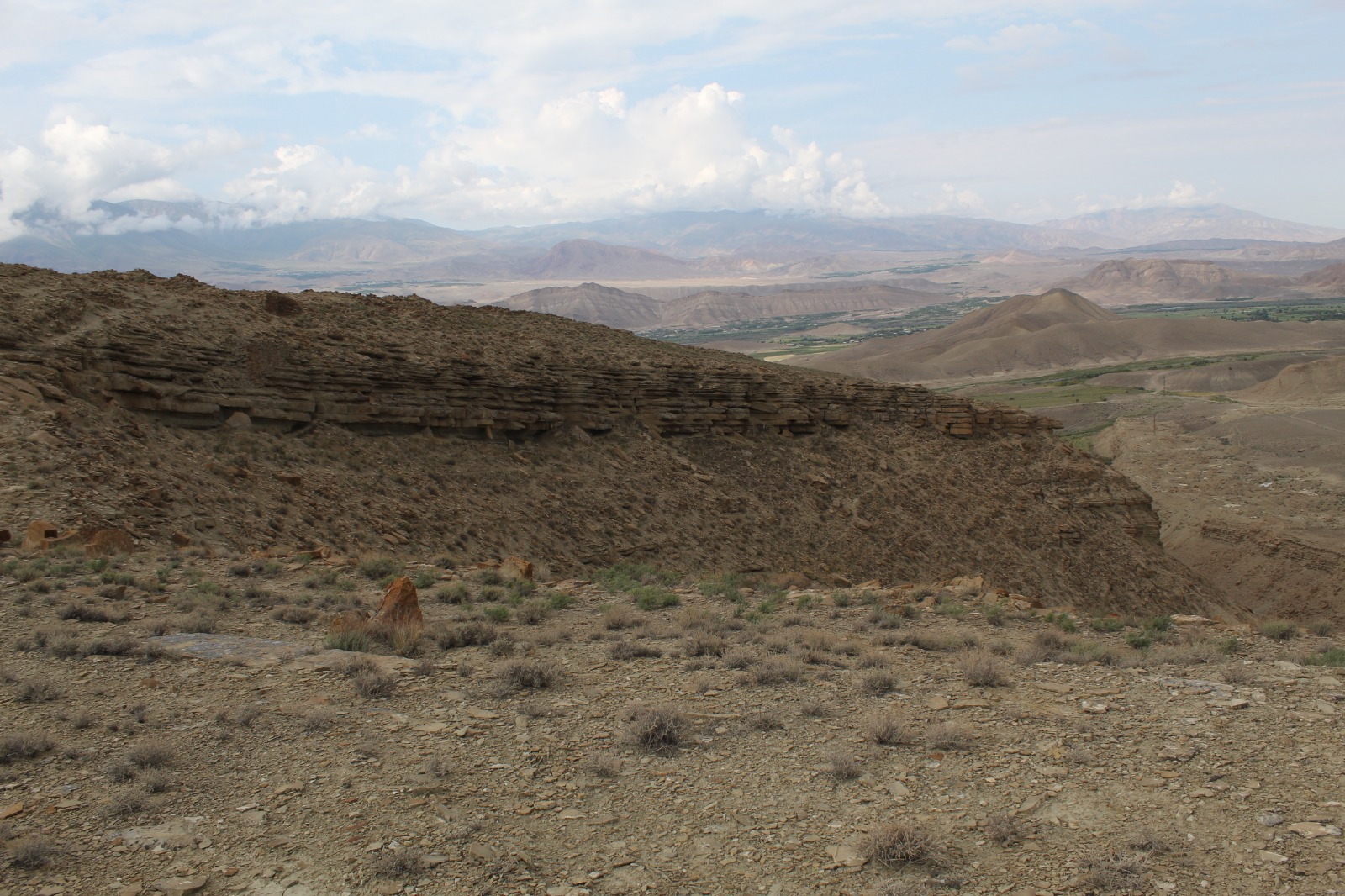
Naringala part of the Kharabagilan

In June 2025, a team of archaeologists led by Dr. Toghrul Khalilov uncovered the main gates and fortified roads leading to the inner city (Narınqala) of Kharabagilan. Archaeologists suggested that the findings of various animal remains alongside glazed and unglazed ceramics from the 12th–13th centuries help reconstruct subsistence patterns and livestock practices of medieval Nakhchivan. The discovery of coins and artifacts alongside structural remains indicate long-term human habitation and provides a chronological framework for analyzing the health and population density of the city before and after its destruction in the 13th century.

== See also ==
- Archaeology of Azerbaijan
- Archaeological site of Selbir
- Institute of Archaeology and Anthropology
