= Çuxanlı, Gobustan =

Village and municipality in the Gobustan Rayon of Azerbaijan

Çuxanlı
- Municipality
- Location within Azerbaijan
- Coordinates: 40°36′04″N 48°47′39″E
- Country: Azerbaijan
- Rayon: Gobustan

Population
  - Total: 757
- Time zone: UTC+4 (AZT)
  - Summer (DST): UTC+5 (AZT)

Çuxanlı (also, Chukhanly) is a village and municipality in the Gobustan Rayon of Azerbaijan. Çuxanlı has a population of 757.
