= Çuxanlı, Absheron =

Çuxanlı
- Location within Azerbaijan
- Coordinates: 40°19′17″N 48°56′14″E
- Country: Azerbaijan
- Rayon: Absheron
- Time zone: UTC+4 (AZT)
  - Summer (DST): UTC+5 (AZT)

Çuxanlı (also known as Chukhonly) is a village in the Absheron Rayon of Azerbaijan.
