= Çalxanqala Fortress =

Bronze Age fortress in Azerbaijan

Çalxanqala Fortress or Chalkhangala Fortress (Azerbaijani: Çalxanqala qalası) is a fortress from the Bronze Age, located 22 km (14 mi) to the north-west of Nakhchivan city.

== Geography ==
It is located near Payız village, on the right bank of the Jahrichay River, on a high hill. It was built with large rocks without using a fixing solution. There is only an access road to the fortress from the south side. The Bronze Age fortress Chalknagala has survived until the present day and has a wall with a length of 450 meters (1,480 ft), a height of 2.5–3 meters (8.2–9.8 ft) meters and a width of 2.7–3 meters (8.9–9.8 ft). According to the Azerbaijani historian V. Aliyev, Çalxanqala was the main defensive fortress of a large tribal union formed in the territory of the Nakhchivan in the II millennium BC.

== Research ==
The first studies were conducted in 1969 by Azerbaijani historians O. Habibullayev and V.Aliyev.

In 1978, there were archaeological excavations conducted by the Nakhichevan archaeological expedition on the territory of the fortress. During the research, a cultural layer with a thickness of two meters was revealed. It was found that the cultural layer consisted of clay layers with an admixture of ash. Here were found the remains of ceramic products, the remains of cattle, limestone fragments, ornamental stones, scrapers and other tools.

The found pottery consists mainly of monochrome ware with black and red patterns. There are also simple clay pots with wavy and straight lines decorated with scratching ornaments.

== Mounds ==
There are mounds of Chalkhangala, dating back to the Late Bronze Age (II millennium BC) in the vicinity. The mounds are conical-shaped. There were earthen graves of a quadrangular shape found under the mounds. Clay products, painted dishes, bronze daggers, spearheads, jewelry-pins, buttons, glazed beads, etc. were found in the mounds.

The painted dishes found in the mounds are completely similar to those found in Kultepe II, Gyzylvang, Zurnabad, and Nahajir I. The surface of the painted clay pots of various shapes is covered with dark red color, decorated with geometric patterns of black color.

== See also ==
- Arсhitecture of Azerbaijan
