= Payız =

- Municipality
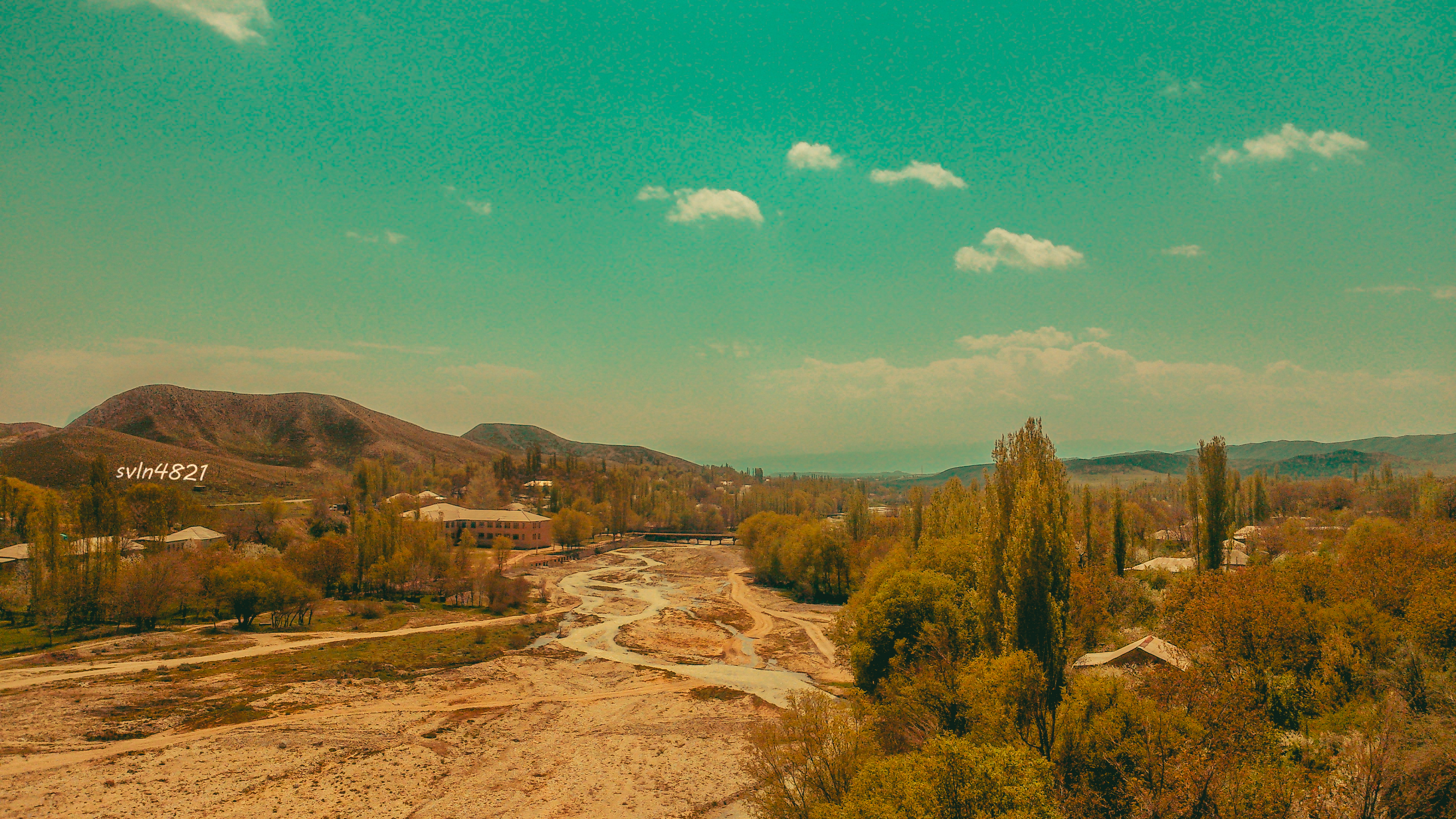

- Location within Azerbaijan
- Coordinates: 39°24′32″N 45°23′06″E
- Country: Azerbaijan
- Autonomous republic: Nakhchivan
- District: Babek

Population (2005)
  - Total: 1,074
- Time zone: UTC+4 (AZT)

Payız (also, Paiz and Payyz) is a village and municipality in the Babek District of Nakhchivan, Azerbaijan. The village is located at the foothills, on both banks of the Jahri River. Its population is busy with grain-growing, poultry and animal husbandry. There are secondary school, club, library, mosque and a medical center in the village. It has a population of 1,074. Nearby have been found the same named monument of the Bronze Age and early Iron Age and the Çalxanqala (Chalkhangala) settlement of the Bronze Age.

== Etymology ==
According to the local people, the real name of the village was Payız ( Autumn) and it was named like that because of its location in the area which suitable for autumn planting. Because of that the area of the village is suitable for autumn planting, here are grown winter grain plants and cotton. In fact, the name of the village was from the word of the payiz which belongs to the Iranian languages and means "end, the last point, slope, foot, bottom,". The village is actually located at the foot of the mountain.

== Historical and archaeological monuments ==
=== Chalkhangala ===
Chalkhangala - the fortress of the Bronze Age located 22 km in the north-west from the Nakhchivan city, on the favorable position from the geo-strategical aspect. It is on the high hill near the Payız village, on the right bank of the Jahrichay River. It was built with large rocks without using the fixing solution. There is only an access road to the fortress from the south side. The length of the survived wall of the Chalkhangala belonging to the cyclopes buildings of the Bronze Age, is 450 m, and its height is 2.5–3 m, width is 2,7–3 meters. Presumably, the Chalkhangala was the main building of defense of the tribe union which was formed in the territory of Nakhchivan at the 2nd millennium BC.

=== Payız ===
Payız - the place of residence of the end of the Bronze Age - first Iron Age in the south-west of the Payız village in the Babek district. It is on the natural hill extending to the direction of the north-south. Its area is about 2 ha. Extensive archaeological excavations weren't carried out. From here and excavated area are collected the archaeological materials (bowl in the pink and gray colored, red painted jug etc.). According to the findings it is supposed that the monument belongs to the end of the 2nd millennium BC to the beginning of the 1st millennium BC.
