= Çuxur Qəbələ =

- Municipality
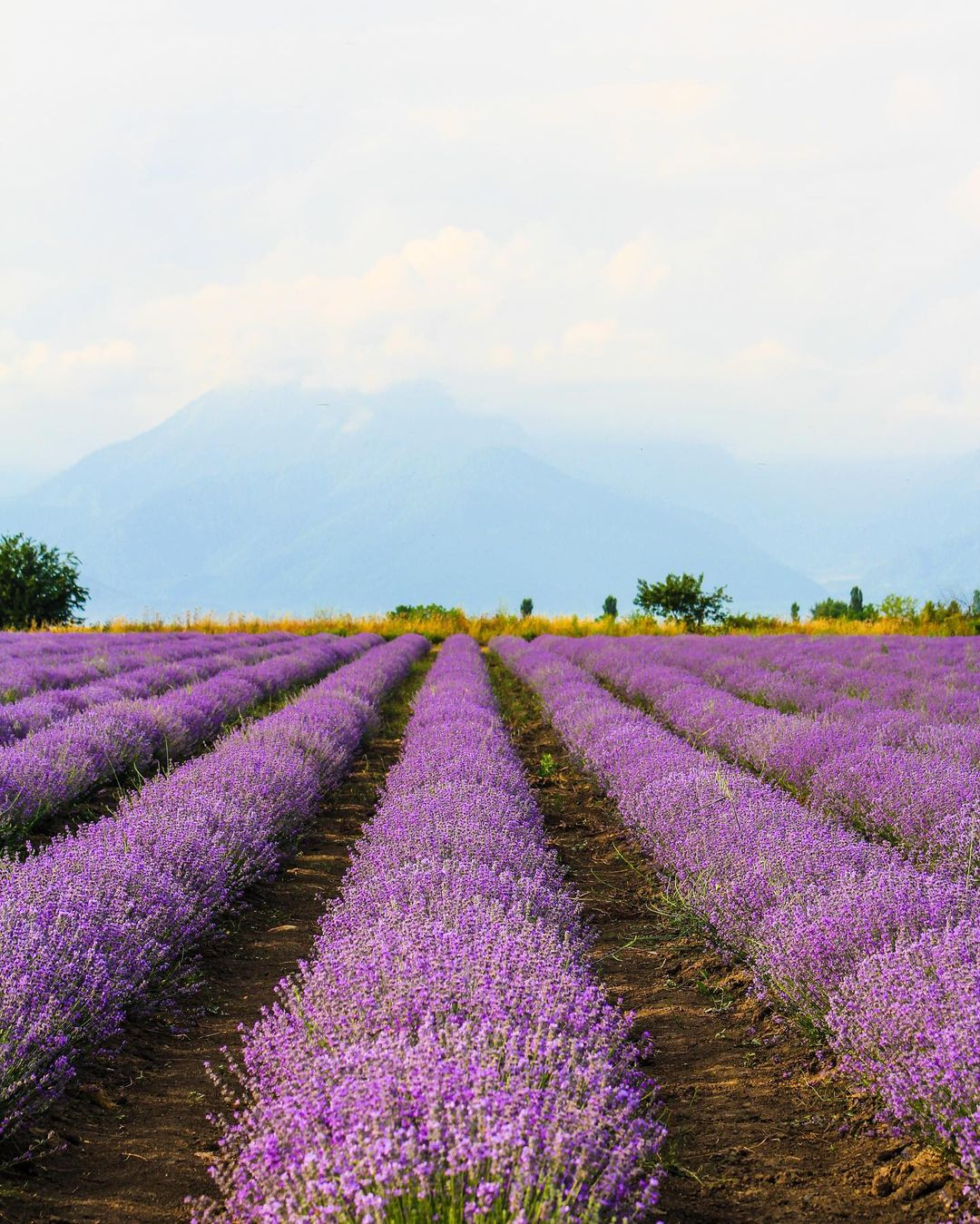
- Lavender field in Chukhur

- Location within Azerbaijan Location within Shaki-Zagatala Economic Region
- Coordinates: 40°53′32″N 47°41′32″E
- Country: Azerbaijan
- Rayon: Qabala

Population
  - Total: 913
- Time zone: UTC+4 (AZT)
  - Summer (DST): UTC+5 (AZT)

Çuxur Qəbələ (also, Chukhurkabala and Chukhur-Kebele) is a village and municipality in the Qabala Rayon of Azerbaijan. It has a population of 913. The village is known as the walled city site of the ancient city of Gabala, which served as the capital of Caucasian Albania for centuries.

== Geography ==
Çuxur Qəbələ is situated in the Qabala District, located in the northern part of Azerbaijan within the Shaki-Zagatala Economic Region. The region lies at the foothills of the Greater Caucasus Mountains.

== Archaeology ==
Archaeological excavations at the site commenced in 1926 under Davud Sharifov. Subsequent work was carried out by various Azerbaijani archaeologists, including Ishaq Jafarzadeh, Saleh Gaziyev (who made discoveries in 1959), Omar Ismizadeh, Gara Ahmadov, Ilyas Babayev, Firudin Gadirov, and Gafar Jabiyev. A renewed phase of archaeological work, involving Azerbaijani and Korean specialists, commenced in 2009 with support from the SEBA (Seoul-Baku) Azerbaijan-Korean Cultural Exchange Association. The site was declared a National State Reserve in 1985.

Archaeological findings from Çuxur Qəbələ include remnants of fortified walls (constructed from stone and brick), pottery kilns, hearths, water supply systems (including pipes), and a variety of artifacts such as pottery, glassware, precious metals, coins (including Drachmas of Alexander the Great and Sasanian coins from the 3rd century CE), and seals from various regions including Greece, Egypt, Syria, India, and Rome, underscoring Gabala's role as an international trade center. The discovery of remnants of a pir (religious place) indicates that the population practiced diverse faiths, including paganism, fire-worshipping, Christianity, and Islam, reflecting the city's multicultural nature.

== Gabala Archaeological Centre ==
The Gabala Archaeological Centre was established in November 2012 and officially opened on September 22, 2014. The center serves as a center for ongoing research and preservation efforts at the ancient Gabala site. It is equipped with a laboratory, a conference hall, a library, storage facilities for archaeological artifacts, a studio for archaeological photography, and accommodations for scholars. Two exhibition halls within the center display artifacts, with exhibits regularly updated as new materials are uncovered through excavations.

== See also ==
- Archaeological site of Tava Tepe
- Archaeology of Azerbaijan
- Bronze and Iron Age in Azerbaijan
- Çuxur Qəbələ at GEOnet Names Server
