= Üçtəpə, Jalilabad =

Üçtəpə
- Municipality
- Location within Azerbaijan
- Coordinates: 39°20′13″N 48°25′39″E
- Country: Azerbaijan
- Rayon: Jalilabad

Population
  - Total: 5,748
- Time zone: UTC+4 (AZT)

Üçtəpə (also, Учтепе and Uch-Tapa and Uchtepe and Учтапа and Uchtapa) is a village and municipality in the Jalilabad Rayon of Azerbaijan. It has a population of 5,748.
