= Çuxanlı, Salyan =

Çuxanlı
- Municipality
- Location within Azerbaijan
- Coordinates: 39°38′40″N 48°58′31″E
- Country: Azerbaijan
- Rayon: Salyan

Population
  - Total: 1,901
- Time zone: UTC+4 (AZT)
  - Summer (DST): UTC+5 (AZT)

Çuxanlı (also, Chukhanly, Periatman, Suleymankend, Suleyman-Kent, and Tschuchanly) is a village and municipality in the Salyan Rayon of Azerbaijan. It has a population of 1,901. The municipality consists of the villages of Çuxanlı and Qırx Çıraq.
