= Govurqala =

Govurqala may refer to:

- Govurqala, Ağdam
- Govurqala, Shaki
- Govurqala, Oguz
- Govurqala, Nakhchivan
