= Stone Age in Azerbaijan =

The Stone Age in Azerbaijan is divided into the Paleolithic, Mesolithic, and Neolithic periods. It was studied in Karabakh, Gazakh, Lerik, Gobustan, and Nakhchivan. Stone materials belonging to the Stone Age were found by Mammadali Huseynov in the Shorsu gorge located near the village of Gyrag Kasaman in Qazakh region. According to his research, people have first settled in the territory of Azerbaijan 2 million years ago. The Stone Age era involved two different human species: Homo neanderthalensis and Homo sapiens.

== Paleolithic ==
The Paleolithic period originated from the first human species’ habitation in this territory and lasted until the 12th millennium BCE. The Paleolithic is subdivided into 3 periods: The Lower Paleolithic, The Middle Paleolithic, The Upper Paleolithic periods.

=== Lower Paleolithic ===
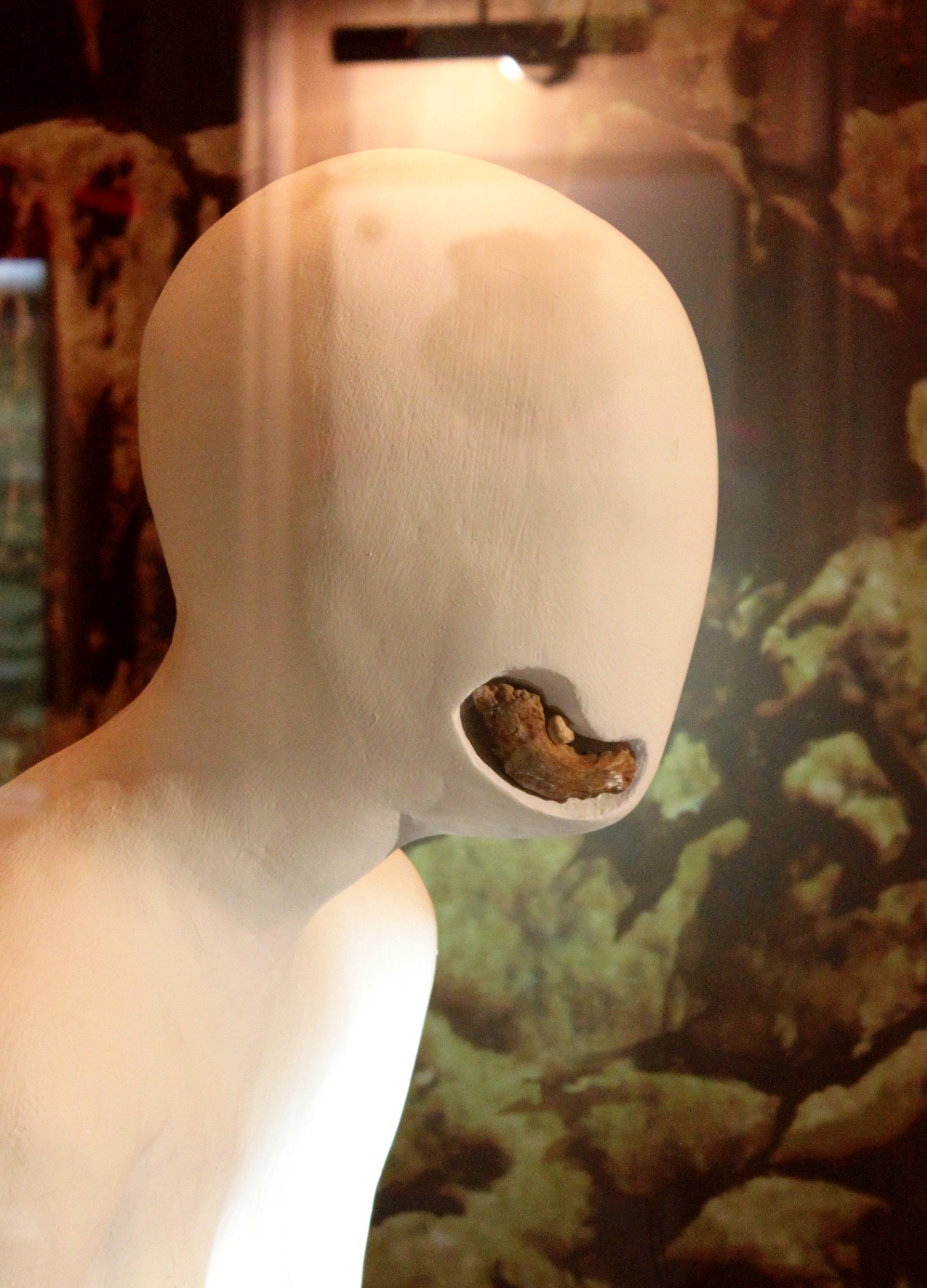
Lower jaw of Azykhantrop in Azerbaijan National History museum

The Lower Paleolithic period continued until 100 thousand years ago in Azerbaijan. The lifestyle of the people living in the Lower Paleolithic period in Azerbaijan was studied in the Guruchay valley, based on materials from the Azikh cave. In 1968, the lower jaw part of azykantrop was found in the acheulean age layer in Azokh cave. There were raw materials for preparing various tools in the Guruchay valley. Ancient people collected stones from Guruchay to prepare labour instruments (tools). Distinguished by its unique features of the techniques and typology of material-cultural samples, they were entitled as “Guruchay culture” at the end of the investigation conducted in Azikh cave in 1974. Guruchay culture had some common features with the Olduvay culture.

Acheulean culture in Azerbaijan developed on the basis of Guruchay culture and is considered its second stage. The findings of the Acheulean culture were depicted in the territory of the Gazakh region in Azerbaijan. The discovery of animal residues shows that hunting dominated during the Acheulean period. Labor instruments were mainly made of quartz, flint, basalt, limestone, sometimes chalcedony and other types of stone.

=== Middle Paleolithic ===
The Middle Paleolithic era began 100,000 years ago and ended 35 thousand years ago. This period is also called the Mousterian culture. The lifestyle of people and human settlements of this period have been studied in Karabakh (Tağlar, Azokh and Zar caves), Qazakh (Damjili cave) and Nakhchivan (Qazma cave). More than 2000 stone tools and thousands of animal bones belonging to the Mousterian culture were found here. Mousterian people spread to the southern slopes of the Lesser Caucasus, from the Mil lowland to Jeyrancol in a large area. The main instruments of this era were sharp-pointed tools. The main occupation of ancient people during this period was hunting and gathering.

=== Upper Palaeolithic ===
The Upper Paleolithic in Azerbaijan lasted from 40 to 35 thousand years ago to 12 thousand years ago. The Upper Paleolithic camps in Azerbaijan were represented by both caves and outdoor camps. Instruments of the Upper Palaeolithic period were found in Damjili, Zar, and Gobustan camps. During this period, the giant deer and the cave bear became extinct, and people started to hunt Caucasus gazelle, roe, deer, mountain goat and other animals. The extensive development of hunting caused a division of labour between men and women. Men were engaged in hunting, while women were controlling fire, sewing clothes, raising children, and managing the household.

== Mesolithic ==
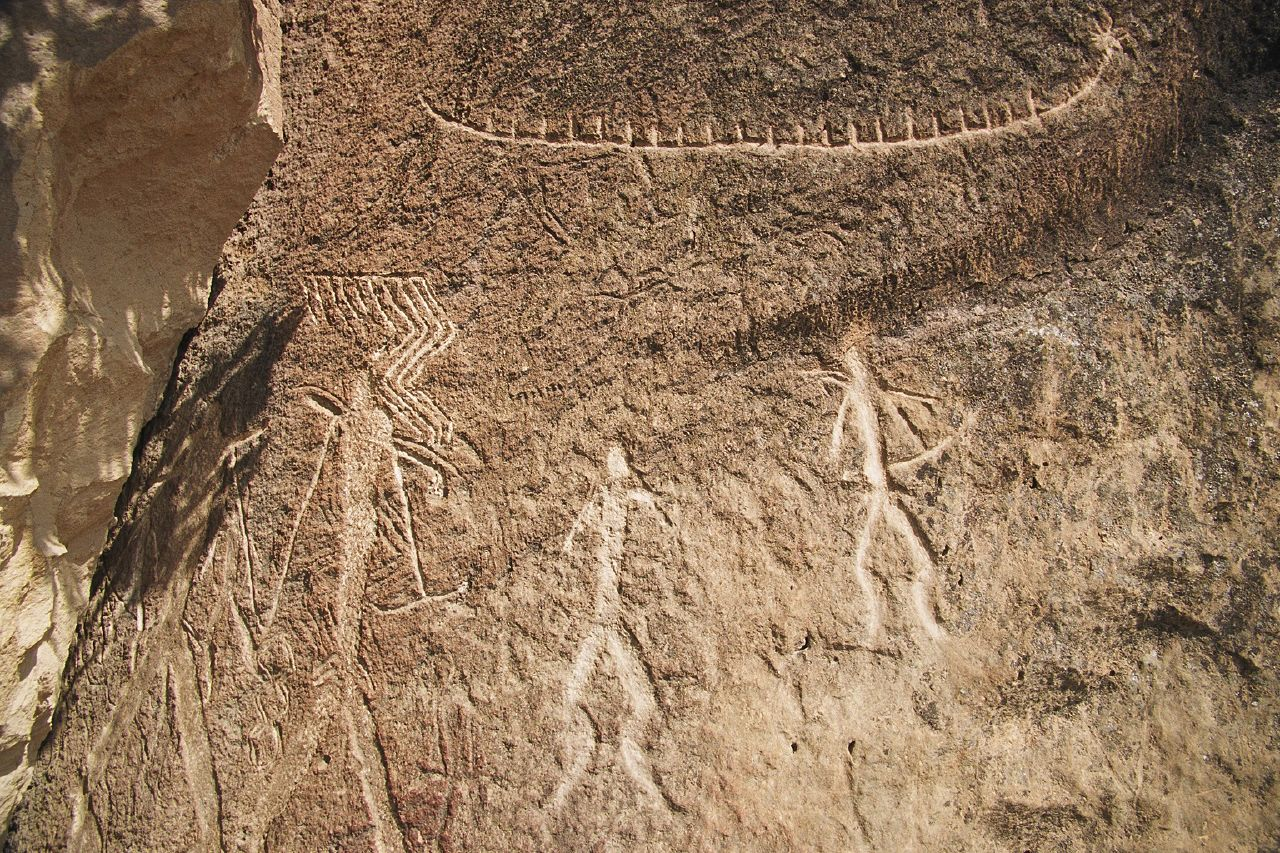
Gobustan rock art

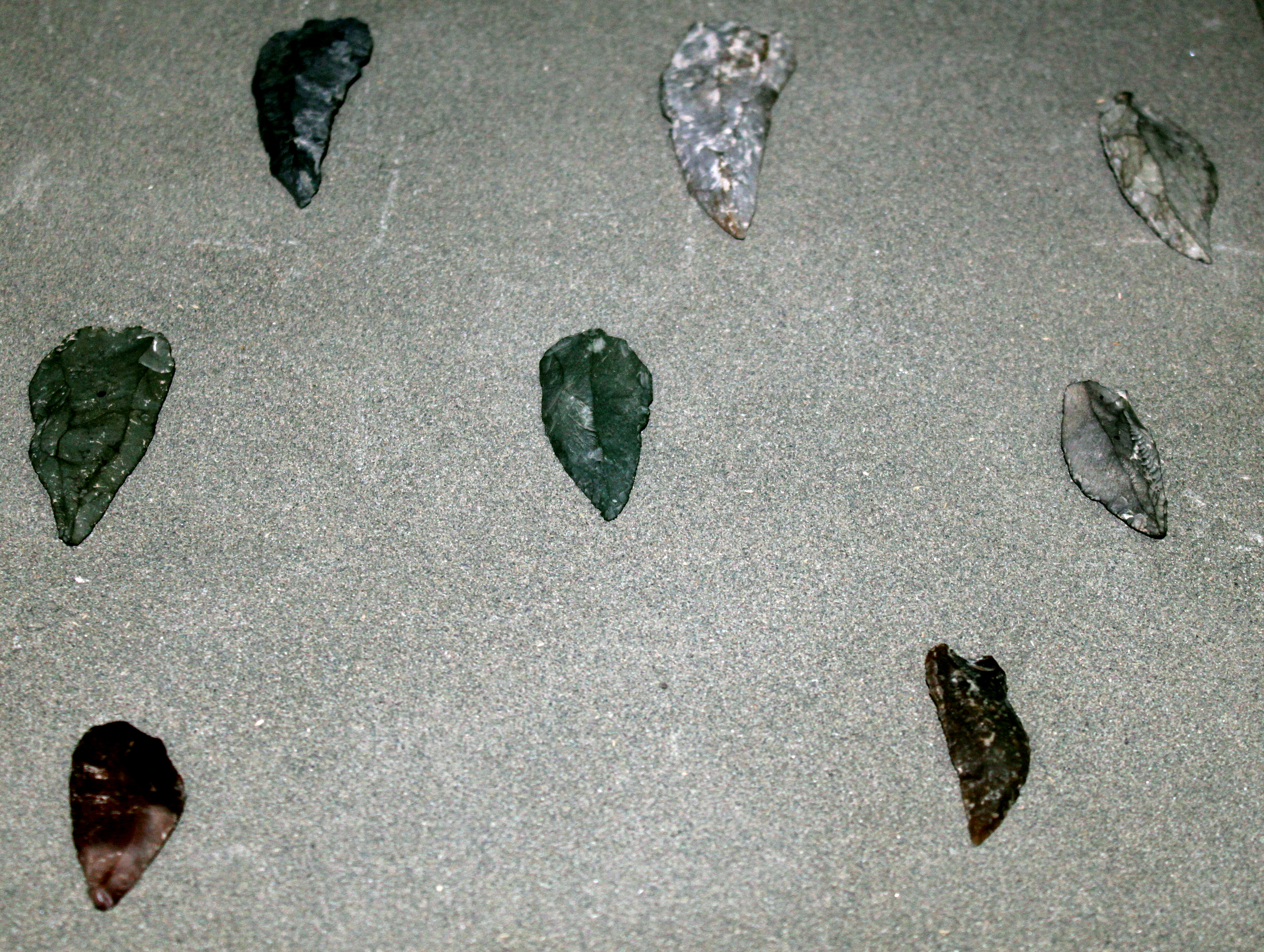
Microlithic tools from Damjili cave

Nearly, 12.000 years ago, the Upper Paleolithic period was replaced by the Mesolithic period (12.000-8.000 BC). The Mesolithic period in Azerbaijan was mainly studied on the basis of Gobustan (near Baku) and Damjili (Qazakh) caves. Stone tools of the Mesolithic period were found in the cave. Numerous animal bones were found in Mesolithic camps in Gobustan. Findings show that hunting had a major place in the life of the ancient people of Gobustan. They hunted wild horses, wild donkeys, oxen, deer, and other animals. The emergence of microlithic stones is typical for Mesolithic. Their size would be 1–2 cm. Mesolithic period findings from the Damjili cave consist of triangular spikes, big circular cutting tools and nuclei which are considered to be used for hunting. For the first time, the animals have begun to be tamed in this period. Studies conducted in Gobustan show fishery played an important role.

== Neolithic ==
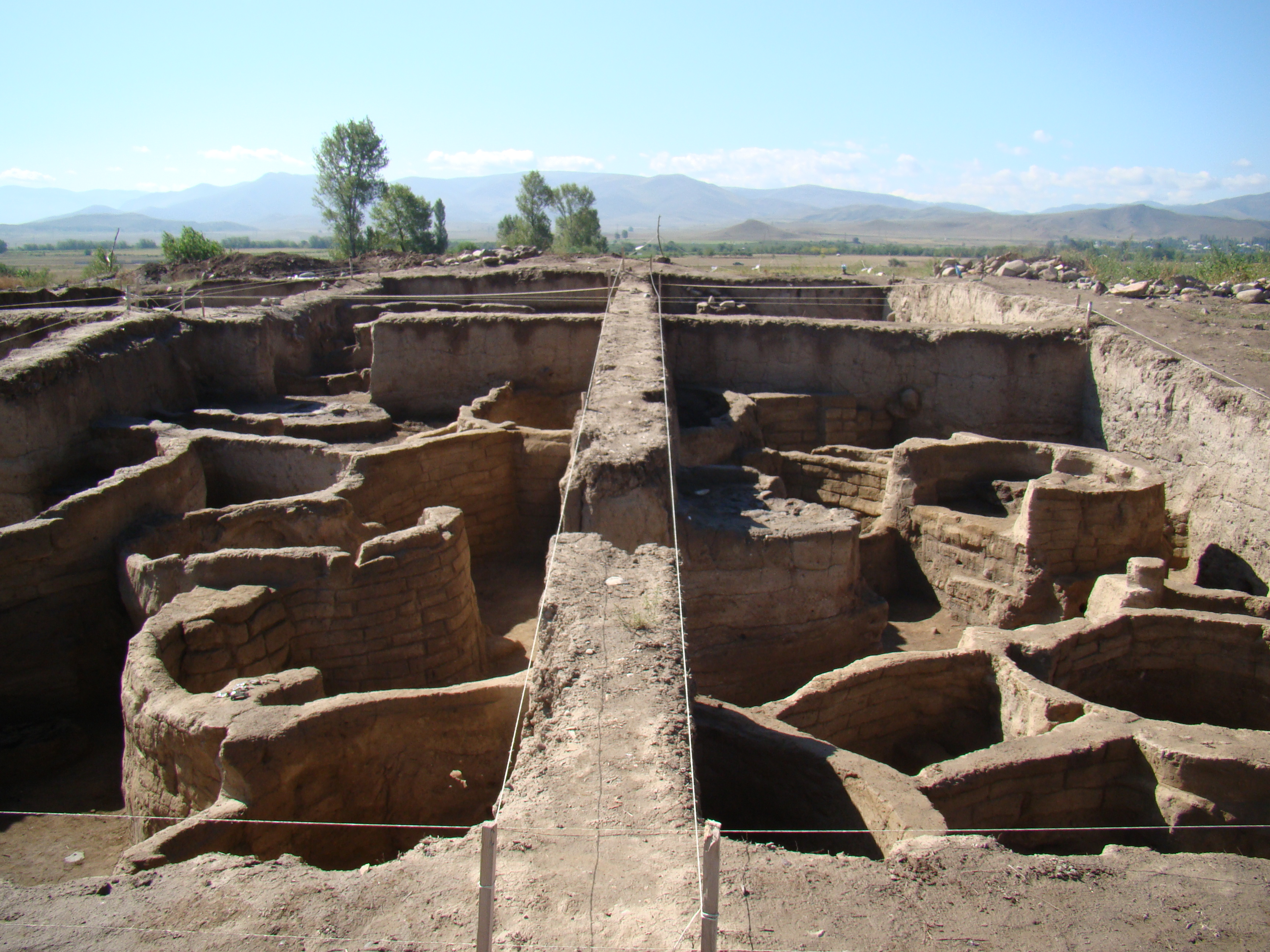
Goytepe archaeological complex

According to the archaeological research, the Mesolithic period was replaced by the Neolithic period in the VII-VI millennium BC. Because of the agricultural revolution of Neolithic period, people started to spread over the areas that have favorable conditions for farming. Material and cultural examples of the Neolithic period of Azerbaijan were found in Damjili cave, Gobustan, Kultepe in Nakhchivan, Shomutepe, Toyretepe, Haci Elemxanli Tepe and other settlements.

The newly excavated settlement of Osmantəpə in the Nakhchivan Autonomous Republic seems to cast light on the intermediate stage between the Mesolithic and Neolithic era. According to Bakhshaliyev, who excavated the settlement, the early Neolithic settlers of Nakhichivan tapped the local obsidian deposits from the Gegham and Zangezur Mountains in South Caucasus which, together with the local ceramic production, created conditions for indigenous development of obsidian production during Early Neolithic. In turn, these new cultural trends together with the obsidian use were later adopted by Iranian and Mesopotamian cultures to the south.

Goytepe is a Neolithic archaeological site in Azerbaijan affiliated with the Shulaveri-Shomu culture and is the largest settlement of the early period of Neolithic era in the South Caucasus. Ceramic, obsidian and basalt, pottery specimens, bone-based labour instruments, plant and animal remnants were found from the Neolithic cultural sequence of the cave. Samples of the Neolithic innovations – ceramics were found in Gobustan and Kultepe I in the area of Azerbaijan.

== Eneolithic ==
The Eneolithic or Chalcolithic period (c. 6th – 4th millennium BCE) was the period of transition from the Stone Age to the Bronze Age. Being laid around the Caucasus mountains which are rich in copper ores, there was a favorable condition for early formation and development of copper processing in the areas of Azerbaijan. Many Eneolithic settlements as in Shomutepe, Toyratepe, Jinnitepe, Kultepe, Alikomektepe and IIanlitepe have been discovered in Azerbaijan, and carbon-dated artefacts show that during this period, people built homes, made copper tools and arrowheads, and were familiar with no-irrigated agriculture.

== See also ==
- History of Azerbaijan
- Bronze and Iron Age Azerbaijan
- Azerbaijan in antiquity
- Early Middle Ages in Azerbaijan
- High Middle Ages in Azerbaijan
- Mongol invasions of Azerbaijan
