= Azerbaijan in antiquity =

In this article, Azerbaijan in antiquity covers the history of the territory of today's Republic of Azerbaijan in the South Caucasus in the period in which Greek and Roman society flourished and wielded great influence throughout much of Europe, North Africa, and West Asia, as well as the Caucasus. The antique period in the territory of Azerbaijan was observed during the existence of Caucasian Albania in the north starting from the fourth century BC. This state emerged in this region after the death of the Alexander the Great and the collapse of his empire in the East in 323 BC.

== Background ==
After the collapse of the primitive community structure in the territory of Azerbaijan, the early tribal units began to emerge which were in close relations with Mesopotamia at the end of the 4th millennium and the beginning of the 3rd millennium BC. The state that emerged after the collapse of these state institutions was Mannea. The kingdom of Mannaeans (9th-6th century BC) was one of the oldest kingdom known which had relations with Assyria and Urartu. From the end of the 8th century BC, beginning of the 7th century BC, the Cimmerians and Scythians, as well as the Saksas and Massageteans began to play an important role in the military-political history of this territory because of the incursions made here and settlement in the territory of Azerbaijan (7th century BC).

The Southern Caucasus was eventually conquered by the Achaemenids around the 6th century BC. The Achaemenids in turn were defeated by Alexander the Great in 330 BCE and it led to the rise of Hellenistic culture in this region.

Albania was part of the Achaemenid Empire in the form of tribes such as albans, sakasens, myukies, matiens, mards (amards), cadusians during the Achaemenid Empire (550-330 BC), which emerged immediately after the fall of the Medes in Iran. After the death of Alexander the Great in 323 BC, these states became independent as a result of the collapse of their empire.

== In ancient Greek and Roman author’s works ==
Antique Greek-Roman authors such as Herodotus, Ptolemy, Gnaeus Pompeius Trogus, Strabo, Gaius Julius Solinus, and Arrian (who mentioned albans for the first time among them) and others mentioned Albania in their works.

Herodotus gave information about the Albanian tribes and the Magh, Caspian, and Udin tribes in his "History". Hecataeus of Miletus wrote about Caucasian Albania in his "Historical Geography".

== Albania ==
=== Borders ===
After the death of Alexander the Great, ancient state was established named Albania in the territory of modern Azerbaijan and in several southern regions of Dagestan. Albania was bordered by Sarmatia, Iberia and Atropatene. Albania's borders extended to the Caspian Sea in the east. Gabala was the first capital of ancient Albania, covering the territory of the modern Azerbaijan Republic, and in the Middle Ages the capital was moved to Barda.

Archaeological finds indicate that Albania was at the center of international trade and Albanian tribes maintained relations with the western and northern regions of the Caucasus, Central Asia, Asia Minor, Syria, Egypt and the Aegean world.

=== History ===
In 331 BC, during the Battle of Gaugamela between the Achaemenid ruler Darius III and Alexander the Great, Albans fought alongside the army of Achaemenid in the army of Atropat.

The Roman general Gnaeus Pompey invaded Albania in 66 BC to gain control of the trade route from India to the Black Sea coast and Greece to the Caucasus. According to Strabo, the Roman legionaries won this battle, known as the Kura (Cyrus) River battle, and the Albanian ruler sent envoys and signed a peace treaty with Rome. After this incident, Pompey attacked Iberia and the Iberian ruler declared his allegiance to Rome. According to Plutarch, in 65 BC Pompey attacked Albania again, because during the attack on Iberia, the Albanians infuriated Pompey with a sudden blow from behind. The Albanian army, led by the Albanian ruler's (Oroezes) brother Cosis, consisted of 60,000 infantry and 12,000 cavalry. The battle near the Alazan River resulted in Roman victory over the Albanians because of the military trick of Pompey. Despite the victory, Pompey did not move inland and stopped marching and returned. After that, the general Antony marched to the Caucasus again in 36 BC and subjugated these states, but the local dynasties remained in power. The Roman emperor Nero planned a great march to Albania through the Derbent passage in 68 AD, but the march did not take place due to Nero's death during the Roman uprising. In 72-74 AD, the Alan tribes living in the north of Derbent passage occupied Albania and returned with the trophy. Roman-Albanian relations lasted until the middle of the 3rd century. After the defeat of Rome in the war between Sassanids and Rome in the middle of the 3rd century AD (approximately 252-253 AD), Albania became a vassal state of the Sassanids Empire.

In 1899 a silver plate featuring Roman toreutics was excavated near Azerbaijani village of Qalagah. The rock inscription near the south-eastern part of Boyukdash's foot (70 km from Baku) was discovered on June 2, 1948, by Azerbaijani archaeologist Ishag Jafarzadeh. The inscription is "IMPDOMITIANO CAESARE·AVG GERMANIC L·IVLIVS MAXIMVS> LEG XII·FVL". According to Domitian's titles in it, the related march took place between 84 and 96. The inscription was studied by Russian expert Yevgeni Pakhomov, who assumed that the associated campaign was launched to control the Derbent Gate.

=== Hellenism in Albania ===
During archeological excavations, coin mints named after Alexander the Great in northern Azerbaijan showed that extensive trade and cultural ties were established with the Hellenistic world during this period. From the middle of the first millennium BC, metallurgy and metalworking, pottery and weaving were developed in Albania and the influence of Greece and Rome traditions was observed. The existence of roof tile production in Albania in the 3rd century BC reflects the influence of the Greeks on the urban culture here.

=== Social life ===
The Albanian population consisted of four classes. In the first class were included the king, leader of the army and ruler, in the second class- priests, in the third class- militaries and farmers, and in the fourth class- ordinary people and employed in the economy.

According to the Greek and Roman writers, Albania was densely populated and soil was very fecund and well-irrigated. People were engaged in cattle breeding and there were many horse stables and pastures. During the archeological excavations, a lot of equipment, household items and weapons made by local craftsmen were found in the territory of Albania. Pottery and ceramics played an important role in economic life and the well-being of the population. Albanians made building materials (roof tiles, bricks), various pottery, human and animal figures from clay. Numerous pottery vessels were found during archeological excavations in Mingachevir.

From the first century AD, local glass production began in Albania.

Coins were widely used in trade in the Albanian state. Silver coin treasures found in Shamakhi in 1958 and in Gabala in 1966 proved that Albanians used coins for trade and produced coins themselves.

== See also ==
- History of Azerbaijan
- Bronze and Iron Age Azerbaijan
- Stone age Azerbaijan
- Early Middle Ages in Azerbaijan
- High Middle Ages in Azerbaijan
- Mongol invasions of Azerbaijan
