= Bronze and Iron Age in Azerbaijan =

Bronze Age in Azerbaijan began in the second half of the 4th millennium BC and ended in the second half of the 2nd millennium BC, while the Iron Age commenced in approximately 7-6th centuries BC. The Bronze Age in the territory of today's Azerbaijan is divided into the early Bronze Age, the middle Bronze Age and the late Bronze Age. Bronze Age was studied in Nakhchivan, Ganja, Dashkasan, Mingachevir, Gobustan, Qazakh and Karabakh.

== First excavations ==
In 1890 research was conducted by Jacques de Morgan in the mountainous areas of Talysh near Lankaran revealing more than 230 burials at different archaeological sites dating back to Late Bronze and Early Iron Ages. E. Rösler revealed the late Bronze Age materials from Karabakh and Ganja between 1894 and 1903 as long as he worked in Azerbaijan as a teacher, and the reports about his findings were regularly published in the Zeitschrift für Ethnologie and Verhandlungen der Berliner Gesellschaft für Anthropologie, Ethnologie und Urgeschichte and the Izvestiya Imperatorskoĭ Arkheologicheskoĭ Komissii. J. Hummel conducted excavations in 1930-1941 in Goygol region (Elenendorf in Soviet times) and Karabakh and unearthed important sites as Barrows I and II, as well as several unknown sites dated back to the late Bronze Age.

In 2012-2013, the French-Azerbaijani archaeological expedition (named Nabialla) explored the necropolis and burial traditions belong to the Bronze-Iron Age in Lenkaran (Lerik province).

== The Early Bronze Age ==
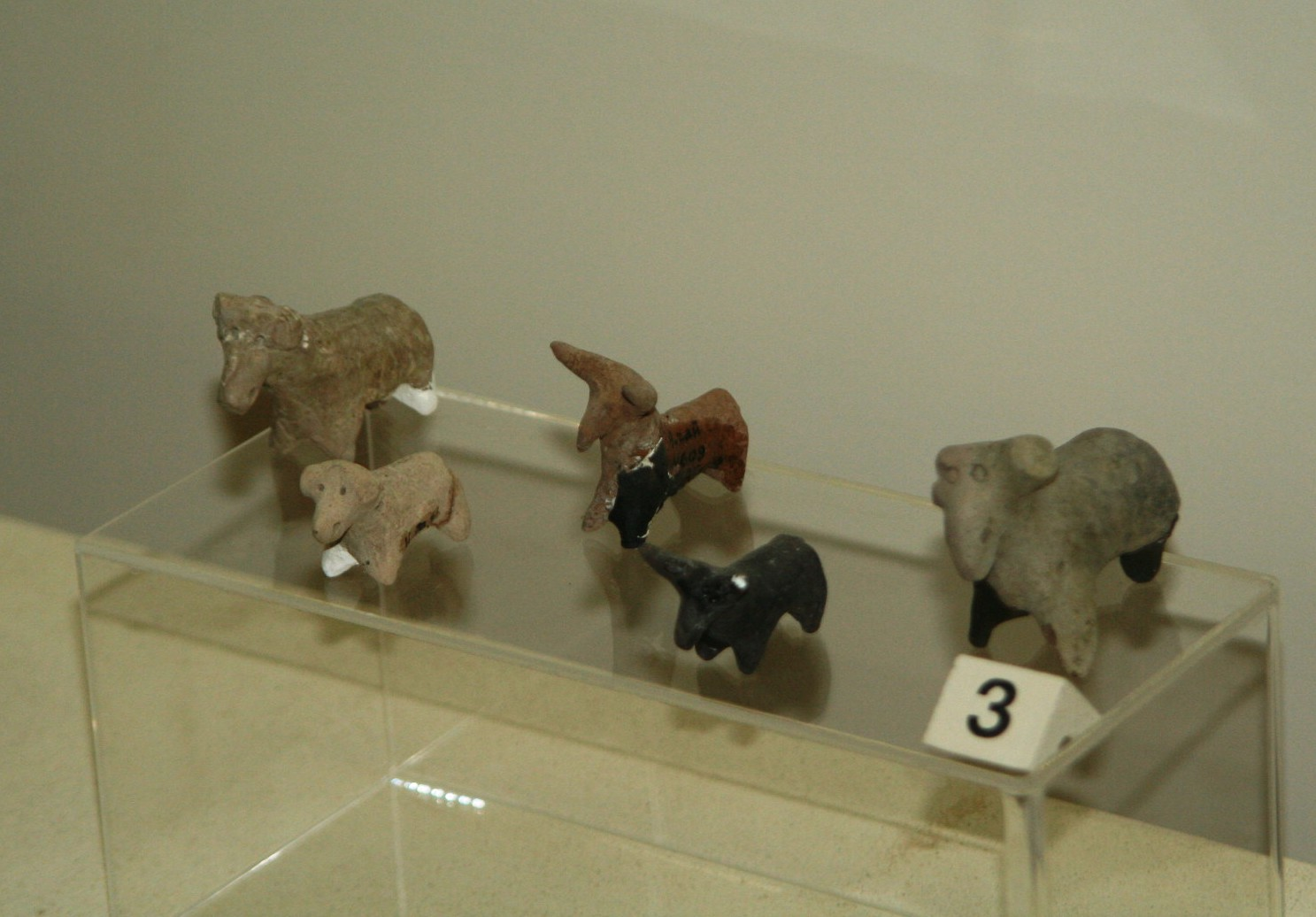
Clay animal figures from Babadervish and Kul-Tepe I

During the Early Bronze Age between 3500 and 2500 BC new pottery, architectural and metallurgical traditions, new settlement types and different funerary traditions appeared. This period is characterized by the Kur-Araxes culture which extended beyond the territory of today's Azerbaijan to the whole Transcaucasia, north-west Iran, Eastern Anatolia, Daghestan, Northern Caucasus, Syria and Palestine and other areas. Discovering similar archeological items or settlements in all these areas showed that the population increased and spread across vast territories. Settlements were constructed on mountain slopes, natural mounds and river bank, in addition to artificial mounds. Property and social differences, tribes and tribal associations arose and people started to move to different areas. The separation of agriculture from cattle-breeding and the substitution of hoe farming by wooden plow farming, notable progress in cattle-breeding led the role of men in society increased and patriarchy (Azerbaijani: ata xaqanlığı- father khakanate) replaced matriarchal system. The Early Bronze Age was studied in Kul-tepe I (second layer), Kul-tepe II (lower layer) in Nakhchivan, Baba-Dervish in Qazakh, Mentesh-Tepe in Tovuz, as well as, in Mingachevir and Gobustan.

Early Bronze Age monuments were studied more thoroughly around the Arpa River in Nakhchivan in 2006-2013 by V. Bakhshaliyev, V. Aliyev, R.Goyushov, K.Morro, S.Ashurov. Polished dishes, ceramic patterns, bronze and bone objects belonging to the Kur-Araxes culture were revealed in the territory of the Ovchulartepesi in Arpachay valley.

Kilns, clay pots and tools dating to the Kura-Araxes culture were revealed in the first layer of Shortepe in 1936 by A. Alakbarov. Early Bronze Age cylindrical, conical, biconical, bowl type dishes were discovered here in 1986-87.

Construction remains, bronze brooch and ceramics samples belong to the Early Bronze Age were found in the Ashaghi Dasharkh site located in Sharur in 2001 by S. Ashurov.

In 1969, two burials of this period were discovered in the Dize village situated in the Arpachay valley. The walls of the oval-shaped burials were built out of river stones and reinforced with clay, while the floors were rendered with clay mortar.

Religious temples, prayer houses were detected in Serker-tepe (Khachmaz), Baba-Dervish (Gazakh), Kultepe (Nakhcivan).

Burials of this period were found outside settlements, only a few within them. In early Bronze Age graves were covered with burial mounds. Newer types of funeral ceremonies and collective burials emerged. In the simple sand burials discovered in Mingechevir, a corp was buried in a bent position in different directions with a clay pot placed near the head. In Xoshbulag, Dashkasan, stone-covered kurgan-like burials were found where corps were buried on by one on their back, bent from the joints, heads positioned to West. İn this type of burials, black jugs with 3 handles and jewelry made from gold, bronze or silver were mainly found.

Two burials under kurgans named Kurgan ST 4 and ST 54 were identified in the Period IV of the Mentesh-tepe (Tovuz district) belonging to the early Bronze Age and associated with the Early Kurgan and Kur-Araxes cultures.

Individual burial pits are also characteristic to Menteshtepe settlement. According to the numerous 14C analyses, individual burials/pits and hearths found in the 2nd part of Period IV of Menteshtepe belong to between ca. 2800 and 2400 BCE.

== Middle Bronze Age ==
The Middle Bronze Age was substituted with the Middle Bronze Age at the end of the third millennium BC continued until the beginning of the second millennium BC. The middle Bronze Age is characterized by “painted earthenware”, or “painted pottery” culture.

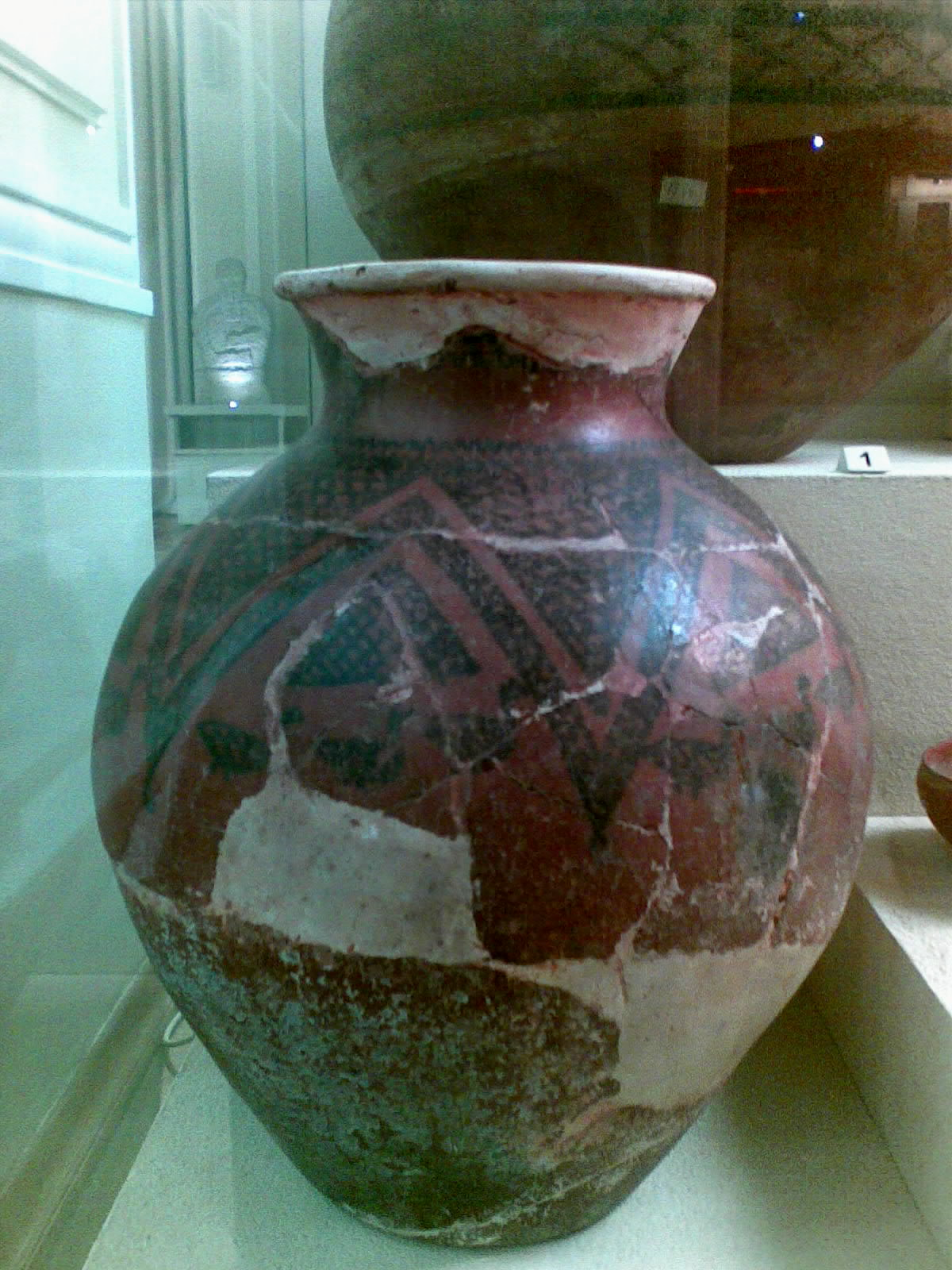
Painted vessel from Kul-Tepe II

During this period, much larger settlements were established, social and property inequality among the population started to increase, more sustainable relationship between the tribes resulted in emerging separate ethnocultural commonalities. Oval shaped settlements of previous periods replaced with houses with several rooms. Besides, cyclopean areas in mountainous territories started to be used from this period as strengthened settlements built with huge parts of rocks in order to protect the possessions of the tribal unions. Based on the findings in Uzerliktepe, Aghdam (grapevine kernel remainings) and in Nakhchivan (stone tools for crushing grapes), grapevine growing and winemaking emerged in this period. Second division of labor occurred in middle Bronze Age and craftsmanship separated from other production areas.

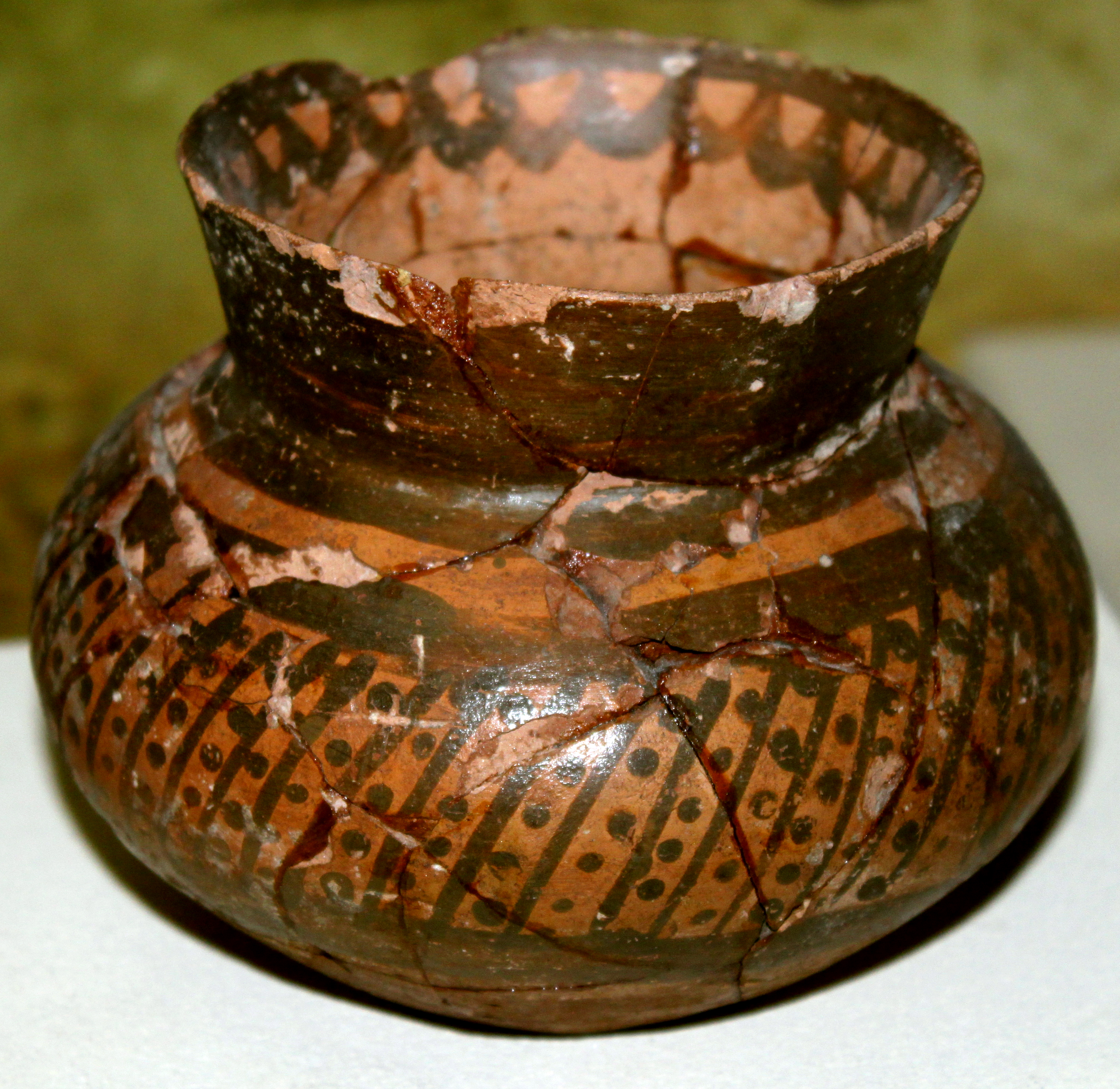
Painted vessel pattern from Kul-Tepe I

Painted pottery culture was first observed during the land works in Kizyl-Vank in 1895. Polichrom pottery patterns shared common features with Haftavan-tepe and Geoy-tepe settlements around the Urmiya lake. The remnants of this period were more commonly found in Nakhchivan (II Kul-tepe, Chalkhangala), Gobustan (Boyuk dash site), and Aghdam (Uzerliktepe), Karabakh (Garakopaktepe), Gazakh (Dashsalahli). City centers and the ancient city of Nakhchivan springed up in the middle Bronze Age.

A.Miller found painted pottery remains from the Kizyl-Vank cemetery (Nakhchivan) in 1926.

16 spearheads and 17 arrowheads were found from burial mounds dating XVIII-XVII century. These spears were from Dashsalahli (Gazakh), Hachbulaq (Dashkasan, Khankendi (Karabakh), Chalkhangala (Nakhchivan). Three of them made from arsenic copper, eight tin bronze, two arsenic tin bronze, two lead-tin bronze. Arrows were from Dashsalahli (Gazakh), Gyzylburun (Nakhchivan), II Kul-tepe, Boyuk Gyshlag (Tovuz). Four of them made from arsenic copper, 7 tin bronze, 2 lead-tin bronze, 1 arsenic tin bronze, 2 copper, 1 copper-lead alloy. The recent studies indicate that most of arrowheads and spearheads were fused from crude materials of local origin with supplementation of imported tin.

On the III layer of the, I Kul-tepe were found wall remnants of four-shaped houses, monochrome and polychrome clay pots and stone tools.

In the Dize necropolis revealed in 2008, were found a pitcher and a cutting tool made from flint. Sharur archaeological expedition investigated three kurgans, grave monuments and fragments of painted dishes.

== Late Bronze – Iron Age ==
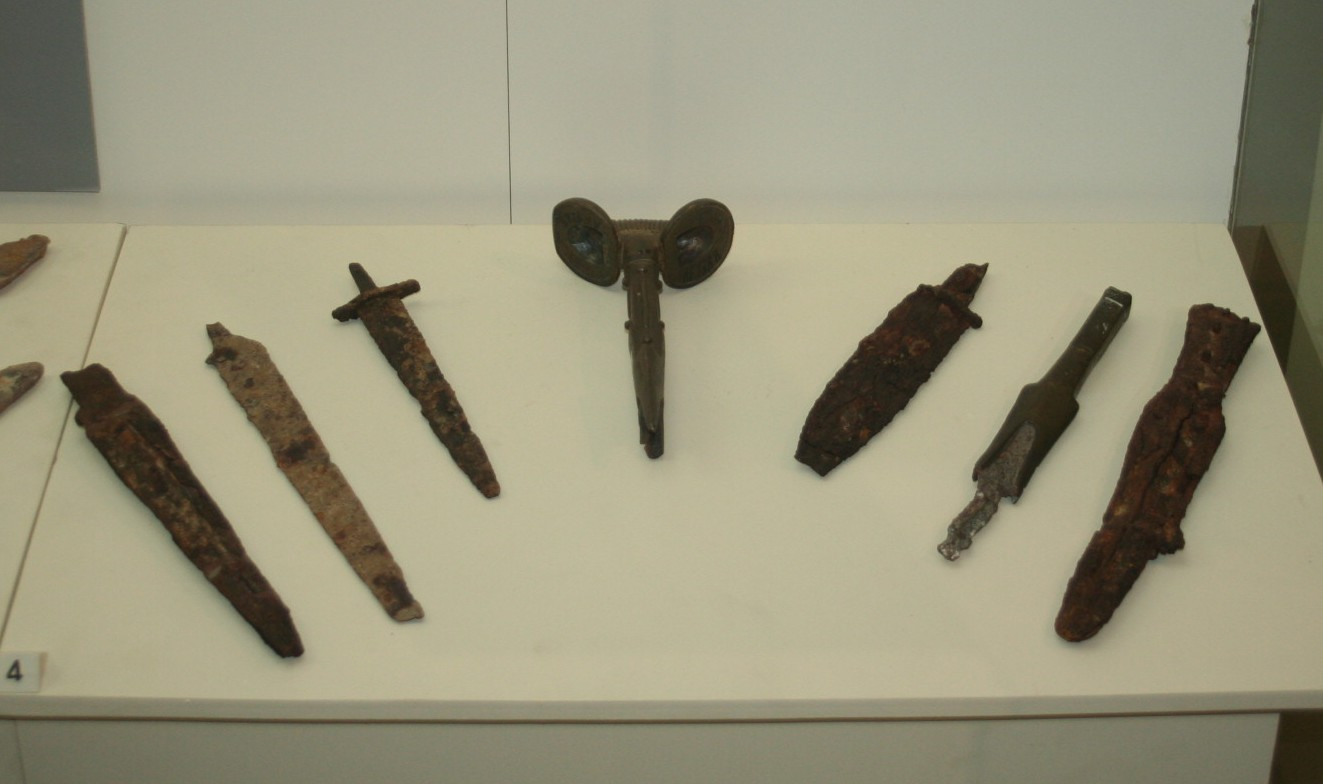
Bronze sword handles-grip and iron swords from Gazakh and Mingachevir

The late Bronze Age and Iron Age covered the 15th and 7th (16th–8th centuries) centuries in the territory of Azerbaijan. Late Bronze Age in the territories of Azerbaijan covering 14th–12th centuries BC, is characterized by archeological cultures of Khojali–Gadabay, Nakhchivan and Talish–Mughan. Burial mounds from the Nakhchivan, Karabakh, Lankaran, Ganja-Kazakh and Shaki-Zagatala regions belong to late Bronze-early Iron Age were studied comprehensively by O. Habibullayev, S. Ashurov, V .H. Aliyev, O. Belli, V. Sevin, V. Karimov. During the late Bronze and Early Iron Age, the population increased, permanent and temporary fortifications were established. The late Bronze Age in Azerbaijan is known for the cyclopean castles which were mainly observed in the Lesser Caucasus region (Dashlitepe, Nagaradagh, Chobandashi, Pir Galachasi, Garatepe). The rich bronze objects discovered in the graves indicate that a military elite already existed by this period. Domestication of horses and the development of animal breeding have created seasonal migration. Horse bones found during investigations indicate that the horse played an important role in society and was worshiped. Collective and individual burials were observed in the burial mounds. The burials were mainly characterized by kurgans, simple sand graves and stone boxes encircled with cromlechs (observed mainly in Gobustan, Karabakh, Nakhchivan, Talish regions). People were buried in a bent form, on their left or right side or on their back, however, there were also samples of corps buried in a sitting form.

The remnants of the Talish–Mughan culture were first revealed by Isak Jafarzadeh in Uzun-tepe in Jalilabad. Bronze and iron weapons and flat daggers were found here with geometric patterns.

Gray and black ceramic fragments dated the end of the second millennium and the beginning of the first millennium BC were found in Karabakhlar Govurgalasi (Nakhchivan).

Emil Rösler found an old man's skeleton, a bronze bird figure, a knife, 2 rings, a gold bead, a gold plaque, and a bead made from agate in Khojaly from a stone box grave. The name of the Assyrian ruler Adadnirari was mentioned on the bead made from agate. This proved that cultural and economic relations have been established with other countries since that time.

The ship drawings depicting the Gobustan rocks showed that there were water and road trade links with the countries of front Asia and the Middle East during this period.

Necropolis with gold and bronze jewelry, remains of ceramic dishes were unearthed by archaeologists in 2018 in the Ganja-Gazakh region associated with Khojaly–Gadabay culture of the late Bronze Age era.

In July 2024, discovery of the 3.500 year-old dining room with lots of ceramic remains was announced in Tava Tepe in Agstafa by the archaeologists from the University of Catania and the National Academy of Sciences of Azerbaijan. The structure features an entrance supported by wooden columns and topped with a thatched roof, which probably extended over the entire complex. The circular structure, marked by numerous holes, indicates a diameter of around 15 meters. According to the archaeologists, evidence of burning, along with the remains of bowls and glasses made from black burnished ceramics found throughout the excavation area, suggests that the archaeological site was used for food preparation and consumption.

== Hounds and Jackals ==
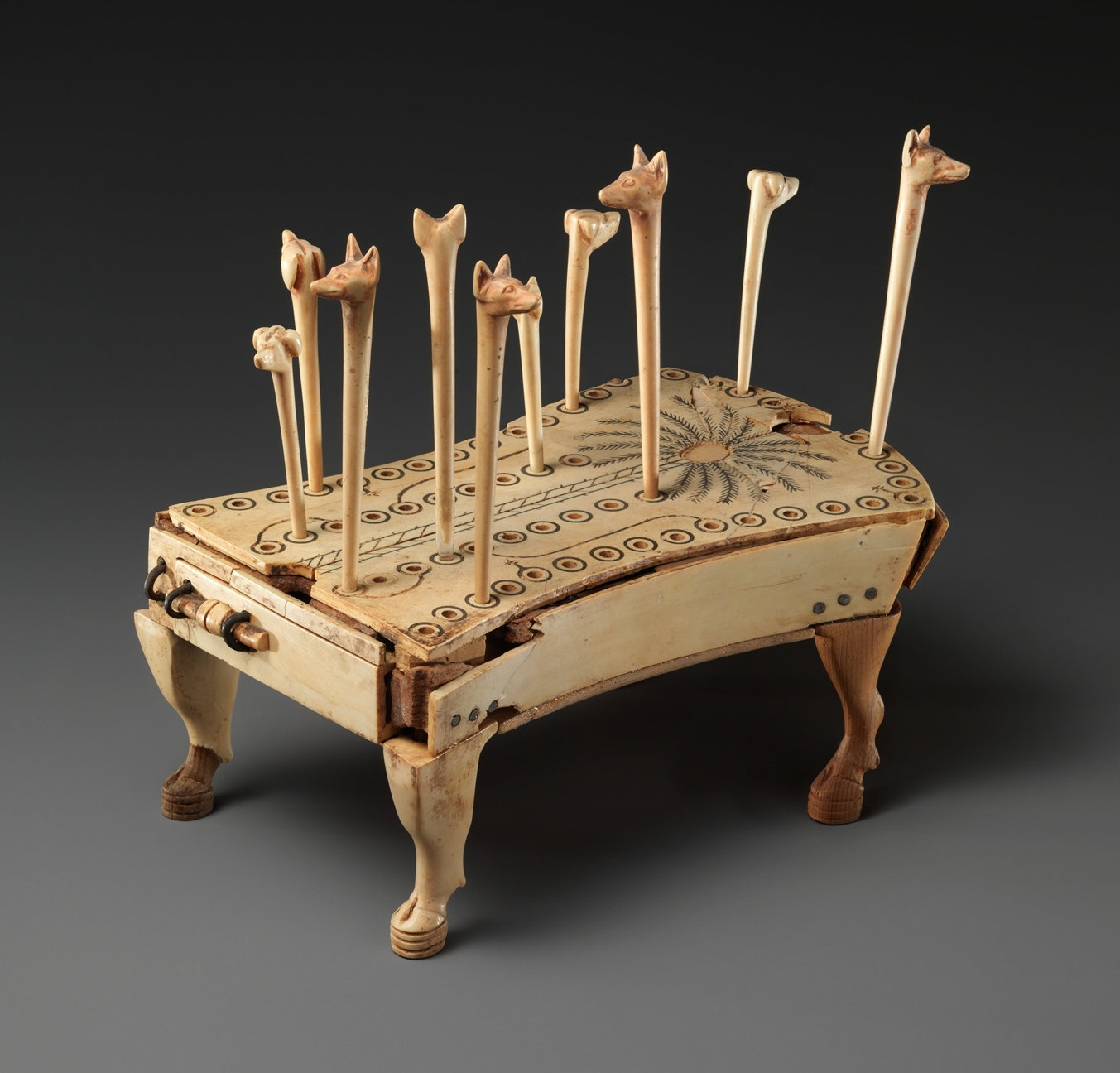
"Hounds and Jackals" game

Archaeologist Walter Crist from the American Museum of Natural History found a Bronze Age board game (4000 year - old) named “Hounds and Jackals” or “58 holes” in Gobustan National Park in 2018. The game was popular in Egypt, Mesopotamia and Anatolia at that time and was identified in the tomb of the ancient Egyptian pharaoh Amenemhat IV.

== See also ==
- Stone-Age Azerbaijan
- History of Azerbaijan
- Board game
- Azerbaijan in antiquity
- Early Middle Ages in Azerbaijan
- High Middle Ages in Azerbaijan
- Mongol invasions of Azerbaijan
