= Zar Cave =

Cave and archaeological site in Azerbaijan

- Zar mağarası (Azerbaijani)
- location in Azerbaijan Zar Cave (East Zangezur Economic Region)
- 40°00′19″N 45°57′08″E
- Periods: Upper Paleolithic
- Location: Zar
- Region: Kalbajar District, Azerbaijan

Site notes
- Excavation dates: 1981

Zar cave (Azerbaijani: Zar mağarası) is an archaeological site of prehistoric human habitation during the Upper Paleolithic. It is located in the southern part of Zar village, in Kalbajar District, Azerbaijan.

During an archaeological campaign in the Kalbajar District from 1981 to 1987, cave paintings of prehistoric humans were discovered. Flint knives, arrowheads and bone combs were also found during the excavations. Traces of dents on discovered boards indicate that they were used for milling wheat. These boards resemble ones found in the Tağlar Cave. It is assumed that occupants of both caves belong to the same group or are related and have interacted. Numerous of the artefacts and items produced in the Tağlar Cave were used at the Zar site.
