= Babadağ (Azerbaijan) =

One of Cacuasian mountains. Located in Azerbaijan

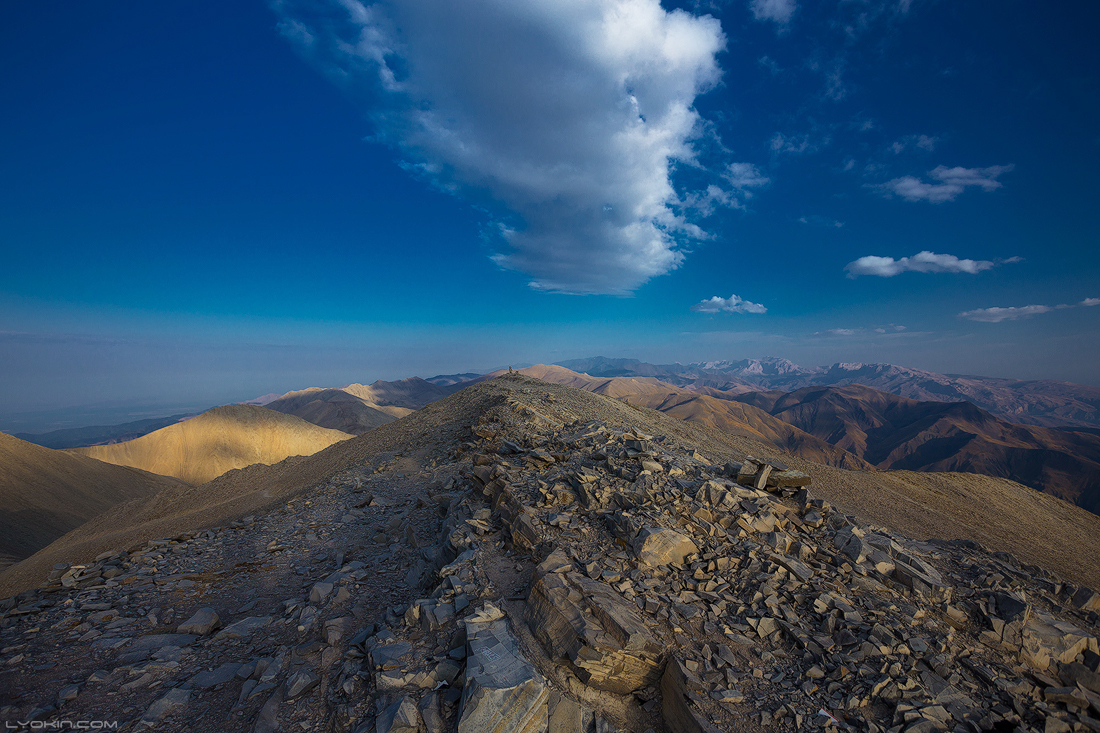

Highest point
- Elevation: 3,629 m (11,906 ft)
- Coordinates: 41°01′12″N 48°18′15″E

Geography
- Location within Azerbaijan
- Location: Azerbaijan

Babadağ is a mountain in Ismayilli District, Azerbaijan. It is considered a sacred site. pilgrims make the long trek to the summit from Babadağ base camp at the foot of the mountain. The route to the summit is steep and there are a number of false summits. Babadag has been under state protection as a monument of national historical and cultural significance since the decision of the Cabinet of Ministers of Azerbaijan dated August 2, 2001.
