= Govurqala, Shaki =

Archaeological sites in Azerbaijan

Govurqala is a name shared by four archaeological sites in Azerbaijan, located in Shaki.

Local Govurqala (220×75 m) is a 5th–14th-century populated place and is also a walled defense stand with round and square towers. The wall width is 1 m at the bottom and 80 cm on top with a height of 5–15 m. Clay jugs, a frying pan, vat and other items were found there. The stand is supposed to be built in Sasanid period to prevent the Khazarian raids and demolished during the Timurid attack.
