= Gilgilçay =

- Municipality
- Location within Azerbaijan
- Coordinates: 41°08′39″N 49°05′12″E
- Country: Azerbaijan
- Rayon: Siazan

Population
  - Total: 959
- Time zone: UTC+4 (AZT)
  - Summer (DST): UTC+5 (AZT)

Gilgilçay (also, Gil’gil’chay) is a village and municipality in the Siazan Rayon of Azerbaijan. It has a population of 959.

== Gilgilchay Wall ==
The Gilgilchay defensive wall was built by the Sasanian Empire (488-531). The defensive line were constructed using a combination of mud brick, stone blocks, and baked bricks, and stretched from the shore of the Caspian Sea to the Babadag mountains in the west. Not far from the Gilgilchay wall is the Shabran wall, located near Shabran village.
