= Govurqala, Ağdam =

Coordinates: 40°11′N 46°53′E

Govurqala is a name shared by four archaeological sites in Azerbaijan, located in Agdam.

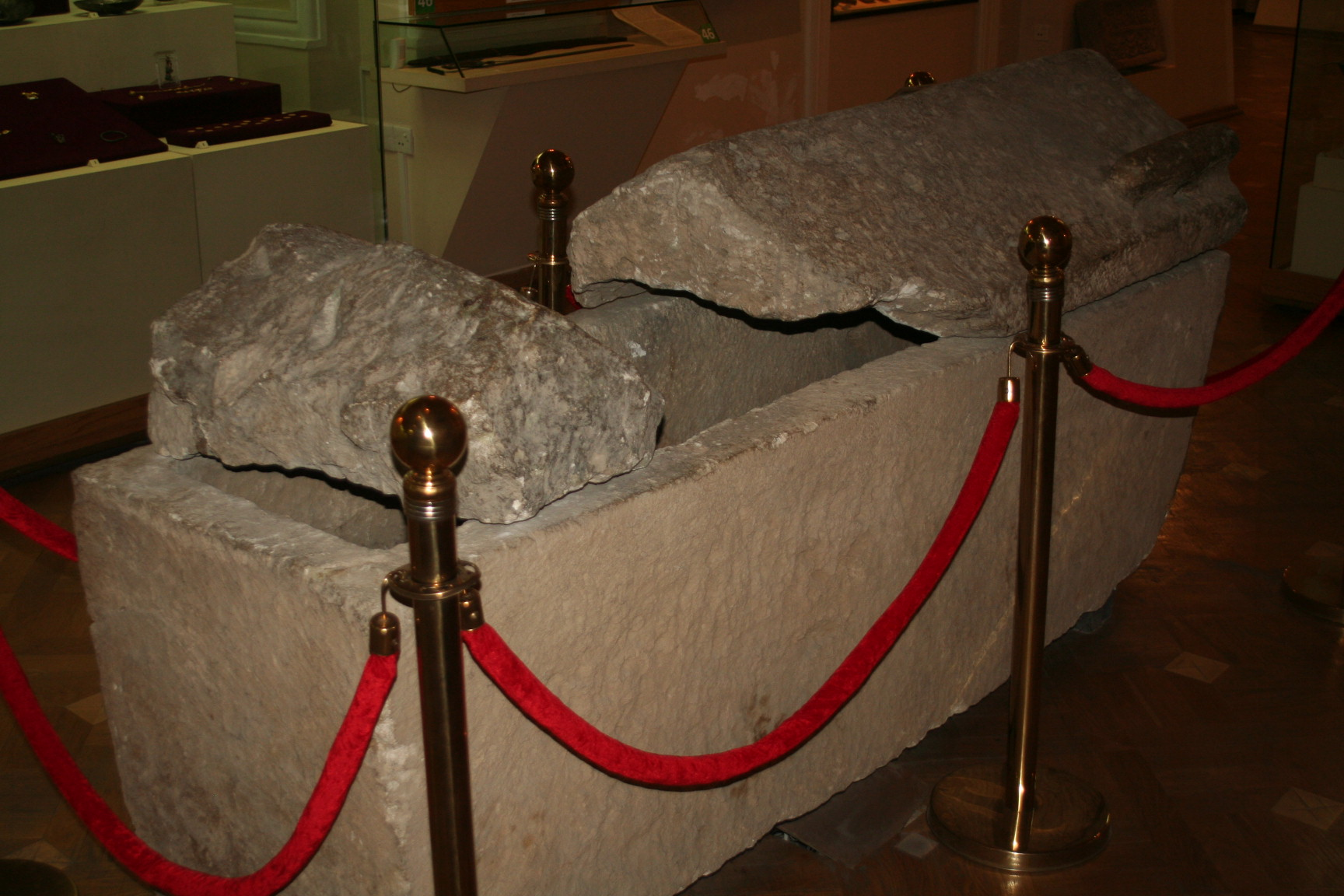
Stone sarcophagus from Govurqala (Aghdam)

Govurqala is within the Boyahmadly village and represents a 3rd–10th-century-related town and cemetery with an area of ca. 40 ha. This Govurqala is estimated to be the summer residence of Caucasus Albania rulers and to have the remnants of the medieval town of Aluen. During excavations beads, weaving instruments, stone houses, Pagan and Christian shrines, glass fragrance vessel and other evidences were found. Currency of Byzantine emperor Anastasius I is also among artifacts. Related works were published in 1965 and 1978 in Azerbaijani (R. Vahidov) and Russian (R. Geyushev).
