= Novomikhaylovka =

Novomikhaylovka may refer to:

== Russia ==
=== Altai Krai ===
- Novomikhaylovka, Barnaul, Altai Krai
- Novomikhaylovka, Loktevsky District, Altai Krai

=== Amur Oblast ===
- Novomikhaylovka, Amur Oblast

=== Republic of Bashkortostan ===
- Novomikhaylovka, Chishminsky District, Republic of Bashkortostan
- Novomikhaylovka, Duvansky District, Republic of Bashkortostan
- Novomikhaylovka, Fyodorovsky District, Republic of Bashkortostan
- Novomikhaylovka, Miyakinsky District, Republic of Bashkortostan
- Novomikhaylovka, Kuyurgazinsky District, Republic of Bashkortostan

== Other countries ==
- Novomikhaylovka, Kyrgyzstan
- Novomikhaylovka, the former name of Zəhmətabad, Bilasuvar, Azerbaijan

== See also ==
- Novomykhailivka (disambiguation)
