= Yeddioymaq =

Yeddioymaq or Yeddioymak may refer to:

- Yeddioymaq, Bilasuvar, Azerbaijan
- Yeddioymaq, Masally (disambiguation), Azerbaijan

- Birinci Yeddioymaq, Azerbaijan
- İkinci Yeddioymaq, Azerbaijan
