= İsgəndərli =

İsgəndərli or Iskenderli may refer to:

- İsgəndərli, Beylagan, Azerbaijan
- İsgəndərli, Masally, Azerbaijan
- İsgəndərli, Shamkir, Azerbaijan
