= Fətullaqışlaq =

- Municipality
- Location within Azerbaijan
- Coordinates: 39°03′58″N 48°27′43″E
- Country: Azerbaijan
- Rayon: Jalilabad

Population
  - Total: 390
- Time zone: UTC+4 (AZT)
  - Summer (DST): UTC+5 (AZT)

Fətullaqışlaq (also, Fatullakyshlak and Fatulla-Kishlak) is a village and municipality in the Jalilabad Rayon of Azerbaijan. It has a population of 390. The village is situated in the forested mountains of southern Azerbaijan, in Jalilabad Rayon, about 19 kilometres (12 mi) northwest by air from Masallı, to the northwest of the village of Alaşar.

== History ==
It was registered in 1917 under the name of Fatullali winter camp. Fatullali was one of the tribes of the Janshali (Jahanshahli) tribe that lived in the Talysh zone in the 19th century, and the area of the village was also a winter camp belonging to that tribe. Later, the village, which became a permanent settlement, retained its old name.

== Geography ==
The village is situated in the forested mountains of southern Azerbaijan, in Jalilabad Rayon, about 19 kilometres (12 mi) northwest by air from Masallı, to the northwest of the village of Alaşar.

== Economy ==
The main occupation of the population is agriculture - farming, livestock breeding and animal husbandry.

== Landmarks ==
Fətullaqışlaq library was established in 1964. It has been cited as having 4628 books.

== Notable people ==
- Tofig Amirli (1992-2020), a member of the Rapid Action Battalion, who participated in the battles for the liberation of Khojavend and Jabrayil districts. He was posthumously awarded the Order For Services to the Fatherland medal by the Azerbaijani President Ilham Aliyev on December 15, 2020.
