= Alvadı =

Alvadı may refer to:

- Köhnə Alvadı ("Old Alvadı"), Azerbaijan
- Təzə Alvadı ("New Alvadı"), Azerbaijan
