= Qədirli =

Qədirli or Kadyrly may refer to:

- Qədirli, Masally, Azerbaijan
- Qədirli, Tovuz, Azerbaijan
