= Zahmatabad =

Zahmatabad (Persian: زحمت اباد) may refer to:

- Zahmatabad, Qaleh Ganj

== See also ==
- Zəhmətabad (disambiguation), places in Azerbaijan
- Zahmatobod, the name of Ayni, Tajikistan between 1930 and 1955.
