= Molalan =

Molalan or Mololan or Mulalan may refer to:

- Molalan, Lerik, Azerbaijan
- Molalan, Masally, Azerbaijan
