= Massaly =

Massaly may refer to:

- Masally Rayon, Azerbaijan
- Masallı, Azerbaijan, capital of the rayon
- Musaly, Sabirabad, Azerbaijan
