= Badalan =

Badalan or Badelan may refer to:

- Bədəlan, Azerbaijan
- Badalan, Iran
- Badalan, Khuzestan, Iran
