= Zəhmətabad =

Zəhmətabad or Zakhmetabad may refer to:

- Zəhmətabad, Bilasuvar, Azerbaijan
- Zəhmətabad, Jalilabad, Azerbaijan
