= Dəlləkoba =

- Municipality
- Location within Azerbaijan
- Coordinates: 38°59′N 48°40′E
- Country: Azerbaijan
- Rayon: Masally

Population
  - Total: 1,331
- Time zone: UTC+4 (AZT)
  - Summer (DST): UTC+5 (AZT)

Dəlləkoba (also, Dellyakoba and Dalenoba) is a village and municipality in the Masally Rayon of Azerbaijan. It has a population of 1,331.
