= Məşədi Hüseynli =

- Municipality
- Location within Azerbaijan
- Coordinates: 39°10′N 48°22′E
- Country: Azerbaijan
- Rayon: Jalilabad

Population
  - Total: 107
- Time zone: UTC+4 (AZT)
  - Summer (DST): UTC+5 (AZT)

Məşədi Hüseynli (also, Məşədhüseynli, Meshadiguseynli, and Mashaduseynly) is a village and municipality in the Jalilabad Rayon of Azerbaijan. It has a population of 107.
