= Hüseynhacılı =

- Municipality
- Location within Azerbaijan
- Coordinates: 39°02′N 48°45′E
- Country: Azerbaijan
- Rayon: Masally

Population
  - Total: 1,040
- Time zone: UTC+4 (AZT)
  - Summer (DST): UTC+5 (AZT)

Hüseynhacılı (also, Guseyngadzhyly and Gusi-Nadzhaly) is a village and municipality in the Masally Rayon of Azerbaijan. It has a population of 1,040.
