= Xanalıyan =

- Municipality
- Location within Azerbaijan
- Coordinates: 38°56′24″N 48°38′01″E
- Country: Azerbaijan
- Rayon: Masally

Population
  - Total: 1,127
- Time zone: UTC+4 (AZT)
  - Summer (DST): UTC+5 (AZT)

Xanalıyan (also, Xanalyan and Khanalyan) is a village and municipality in the Masally Rayon of Azerbaijan. It has a population of 1,127.
