= Göyəçöl =

- Municipality
- Location within Azerbaijan
- Coordinates: 38°59′35″N 48°42′37″E
- Country: Azerbaijan
- Rayon: Masally

Population
  - Total: 3,213
- Time zone: UTC+4 (AZT)
  - Summer (DST): UTC+5 (AZT)

Göyəçöl, or Gəyəçöl, is a village and municipality in the Masally Rayon of Azerbaijan. It has a population of 3,213.
