= İnili =

- Municipality
- Location within Azerbaijan
- Coordinates: 39°16′N 48°24′E
- Country: Azerbaijan
- Rayon: Jalilabad

Population
  - Total: 533
- Time zone: UTC+4 (AZT)
  - Summer (DST): UTC+5 (AZT)

İnili (also, Inilli and Inili) is a village and municipality in the Jalilabad Rayon of Azerbaijan. It has a population of 533.
