= Tyulkyulyu =

- Location within Azerbaijan
- Coordinates: 39°12′N 48°16′E
- Country: Azerbaijan
- Rayon: Jalilabad
- Time zone: UTC+4 (AZT)

Tyulkyulyu (also, Tyul’kyulyu and Tyurkyuli) is a village in the Jalilabad Rayon of Azerbaijan.
