= Albalan =

- Municipality
- Location within Azerbaijan
- Coordinates: 39°08′N 48°25′E
- Country: Azerbaijan
- Rayon: Jalilabad

Population
  - Total: 555
- Time zone: UTC+4 (AZT)

Albalan is a village and municipality in the Jalilabad Rayon of Azerbaijan. It has a population of 555.
