= Çayqıraq =

Village and municipality in Azerbaijan

Coordinates: 38°58′N 48°41′E

Çayqıraq is a village and municipality in the Masally Rayon of Azerbaijan. It has a population of 1,352.
