= Zharskiy =

- Location within Azerbaijan
- Coordinates: 39°00′10″N 49°10′22″E
- Country: Azerbaijan
- Rayon: Masally
- Time zone: UTC+4 (AZT)
  - Summer (DST): UTC+5 (AZT)

Zharskiy (also, Zharovskiye) is a village in the Masally Rayon of Azerbaijan.
