= Sərhədabad =

- Municipality
- Location within Azerbaijan
- Coordinates: 39°14′08″N 48°26′34″E
- Country: Azerbaijan
- Rayon: Jalilabad

Population
  - Total: 1,595
- Time zone: UTC+4 (AZT)
  - Summer (DST): UTC+5 (AZT)

Sərhədabad (also, Sakhradaba and Sarkhadabad) is a village and municipality in the Jalilabad Rayon of Azerbaijan. It has a population of 1,595.
