= Zərbəli =

- Municipality
- Location within Azerbaijan
- Coordinates: 39°18′N 48°19′E
- Country: Azerbaijan
- Rayon: Jalilabad

Population
  - Total: 388
- Time zone: UTC+4 (AZT)

Zərbəli (also, Zarbaly) is a village and municipality in the Jalilabad Rayon of Azerbaijan. It has a population of 388. The estimate terrain elevation above sea level is 148 meters.
