= Sirəbil =

- Municipality
- Location within Azerbaijan
- Coordinates: 38°57′N 48°43′E
- Country: Azerbaijan
- Rayon: Masally

Population
  - Total: 697
- Time zone: UTC+4 (AZT)
  - Summer (DST): UTC+5 (AZT)

Sirəbil (also, Sirabil) is a village and municipality in the Masally Rayon of Azerbaijan. It has a population of 697.
