= Sabirabad =

Sabirabad may refer to:

- Sabirabad Rayon, Azerbaijan
- Sabirabad (city), capital of Sabirabad Rayon
- Sabirabad, Jalilabad, Azerbaijan
