= Kövüzbulaq =

- Municipality
- Location within Azerbaijan
- Coordinates: 39°09′13″N 48°15′49″E
- Country: Azerbaijan
- Rayon: Jalilabad
- Time zone: UTC+4 (AZT)
  - Summer (DST): UTC+5 (AZT)

Kövüzbulaq (also, Hovuzbulaq, Gëvuzbulak, Geyuzblakh, and Keyuz-Bulakh) is a village and municipality in the Jalilabad Rayon of Azerbaijan.
