= Sadatlı =

- Municipality
- Location within Azerbaijan
- Coordinates: 39°07′43″N 48°22′12″E
- Country: Azerbaijan
- Rayon: Jalilabad

Population
  - Total: 721
- Time zone: UTC+4 (AZT)

Sadatlı is a village and municipality in the Jalilabad District of Azerbaijan. It has a population of 721.

== Religion ==
An officially registered Muslim religious community operates in this village.
