= Öncəqala =

- Municipality
- Location within Azerbaijan
- Coordinates: 39°01′58″N 48°43′18″E
- Country: Azerbaijan
- Rayon: Masally

Population
  - Total: 1,898
- Time zone: UTC+4 (AZT)
  - Summer (DST): UTC+5 (AZT)

Öncəqala (also, Ondzhakyala and Ondzha-Kelya) is a village and municipality in the Masally Rayon of Azerbaijan. It has a population of 1,898.
