= Abışabad =

- Municipality
- Location within Azerbaijan
- Coordinates: 39°15′23″N 48°24′21″E
- Country: Azerbaijan
- Rayon: Jalilabad

Population
  - Total: 1,124
- Time zone: UTC+4 (AZT)

Abışabad (also, Abyshabad, Abushabad, and Abush-Abad) is a village and municipality in the Jalilabad Rayon of Azerbaijan. It has a population of 1,124.
