= Mirzəli =

- Municipality
- Location within Azerbaijan
- Coordinates: 39°13′27″N 48°21′16″E
- Country: Azerbaijan
- Rayon: Jalilabad

Population
  - Total: 719
- Time zone: UTC+4 (AZT)
  - Summer (DST): UTC+5 (AZT)

Mirzəli (also, Mirzali) is a village and municipality in the Jalilabad Rayon of Azerbaijan. It has a population of 719.
