= Aşurlu =

- Municipality
- Location within Azerbaijan
- Coordinates: 38°57′N 48°41′E
- Country: Azerbaijan
- Rayon: Masally

Population
  - Total: 1,884
- Time zone: UTC+4 (AZT)

Aşurlu (also, Ashurlu and Ashurli) is a village and municipality in the Masally Rayon of Azerbaijan. It has a population of 1,884.
