= Şötüklü =

- Municipality
- Location within Azerbaijan
- Coordinates: 39°14′N 48°15′E
- Country: Azerbaijan
- Rayon: Jalilabad

Şötüklü is a village and municipality in the Jalilabad Rayon of Azerbaijan. It has a population of 343.
