= Məmmədrzalı =

- Municipality
- Location within Azerbaijan
- Coordinates: 39°14′29″N 48°18′03″E
- Country: Azerbaijan
- Rayon: Jalilabad

Population
  - Total: 1,491
- Time zone: UTC+4 (AZT)
  - Summer (DST): UTC+5 (AZT)

Məmmədrzalı (also, Mamed-Rzali and Mamedrzaly) is a village and municipality in the Jalilabad Rayon of Azerbaijan. It has a population of 1,491.
