= Mahmudavar =

- Municipality
- Location within Azerbaijan
- Coordinates: 38°53′36″N 48°42′14″E
- Country: Azerbaijan
- Rayon: Masally

Population
  - Total: 7,621
- Time zone: UTC+4 (AZT)
  - Summer (DST): UTC+5 (AZT)

Mahmudavar (Talysh: Mədo) is a village and municipality in the Masally Rayon of Azerbaijan. It has a population of 7,621.
