= Babaser =

- Municipality
- Location within Azerbaijan
- Coordinates: 38°56′49″N 48°40′50″E
- Country: Azerbaijan
- Rayon: Masally

Population
  - Total: 1,401
- Time zone: UTC+4 (AZT)
  - Summer (DST): UTC+5 (AZT)

Babaser (also Babasyr) is a village and municipality in the Masally Rayon of Azerbaijan. It has a population of 1,401.
