= Ağakişibəyli =

Aghakishibeyli
- Municipality
- Azerbaijani: Ağakişibəyli
- Location within Azerbaijan
- Coordinates: 39°04′N 48°41′E
- Country: Azerbaijan
- District: Masally

Population
  - Total: 1,673
- Time zone: UTC+4 (AZT)

Ağakişibəyli (also, Aghakishibeyli) is a village and municipality in the Masally District of Azerbaijan. It has a population of 1,673.
