= Güllütəpə =

- Municipality
- Location within Azerbaijan
- Coordinates: 39°02′55″N 48°34′39″E
- Country: Azerbaijan
- Rayon: Masally

Population
  - Total: 2,383
- Time zone: UTC+4 (AZT)
  - Summer (DST): UTC+5 (AZT)

Güllütəpə (also, Qüllütəpə, Güllütäpä, Gyullyutepe, and Gyulu-Tapa) is a village and municipality in the Masally Rayon of Azerbaijan. It has a population of 2,383. The municipality consists of the villages of Güllütəpə and Əmirtürbə.
