= Qarazəncir =

- Municipality
- Location within Azerbaijan
- Coordinates: 39°11′27″N 48°36′29″E
- Country: Azerbaijan
- Rayon: Jalilabad

Population
  - Total: 2,528
- Time zone: UTC+4 (AZT)
  - Summer (DST): UTC+5 (AZT)

Qarazəncir is a village and municipality in the Jalilabad Rayon of Azerbaijan. It has a population of 2,528.
