= Çünəxanlı =

Village in Jalilabad Rayon, Azerbaijan

Coordinates: 39°11′N 48°24′E

Çünəxanlı is a village and municipality in the Jalilabad Rayon of Azerbaijan. It has a population of 233.
