= Yolağac =

- Municipality
- Location within Azerbaijan
- Coordinates: 39°00′47″N 48°32′06″E
- Country: Azerbaijan
- Rayon: Masally

Population
  - Total: 729
- Time zone: UTC+4 (AZT)
  - Summer (DST): UTC+5 (AZT)

Yolağac (also, Yelagach) is a village and municipality in the Masally Rayon of Azerbaijan. It has a population of 729.
