= Tyuklya =

- Location within Azerbaijan
- Coordinates: 38°55′N 48°41′E
- Country: Azerbaijan
- Rayon: Masally
- Time zone: UTC+4 (AZT)
  - Summer (DST): UTC+5 (AZT)

Tyuklya (also known as Tuklya) is a village in the Masally District of Azerbaijan.
