= Oğrubulaq =

- Municipality
- Location within Azerbaijan
- Coordinates: 39°04′04″N 48°26′44″E
- Country: Azerbaijan
- Rayon: Jalilabad

Population
  - Total: 235
- Time zone: UTC+4 (AZT)
  - Summer (DST): UTC+5 (AZT)

Oğrubulaq (also, Ogrubulak and Ogru-Bulakh) is a village and municipality in the Jalilabad Rayon of Azerbaijan. It has a population of 235.
