= Abazallı =

- Municipality
- Location within Azerbaijan
- Coordinates: 39°16′31″N 48°21′44″E
- Country: Azerbaijan
- Rayon: Jalilabad

Population
  - Total: 771
- Time zone: UTC+4 (AZT)

Abazallı (also, Abasalılı, Abazally, and Abasaly) is a village and municipality in the Jalilabad Rayon of Azerbaijan. It has a population of 771.
