= Qamışlıgöl =

- Municipality
- Location within Azerbaijan
- Coordinates: 39°07′N 48°23′E
- Country: Azerbaijan
- Rayon: Jalilabad

Population
  - Total: 459
- Time zone: UTC+4 (AZT)
  - Summer (DST): UTC+5 (AZT)

Qamışlıgöl (also, Gamyshlygël, Gamyshlygël’, and Kamyshly-Gel) is a village and municipality in the Jalilabad Rayon of Azerbaijan. It has a population of 459.
