= Məlikqasımlı =

- Municipality
- Location within Azerbaijan
- Coordinates: 39°13′21″N 48°12′55″E
- Country: Azerbaijan
- Rayon: Jalilabad

Population
  - Total: 1,707
- Time zone: UTC+4 (AZT)
  - Summer (DST): UTC+5 (AZT)

Məlikqasımlı (also, Melik-Kasum and Melikkasymly) is a village and municipality in the Jalilabad Rayon of Azerbaijan. It has a population of 1,707.
