= Birinci Tiyaqani =

Coordinates: 38°55′N 48°41′E

Birinci Tiyaqani is a village and municipality in the Masally Rayon of Azerbaijan. It has a population of 290.
