= Pircana =

Village and municipality in Azerbaijan

Coordinates: 38°59′N 48°41′E

Sarıcəfərli is a village and municipality in the Masally Rayon of Azerbaijan. It has a population of 444.
