= Cəfərxanlı =

Jafarkhanly
- Village
- Azerbaijani: Cəfərxanlı
- Location within Azerbaijan
- Coordinates: 39°19′N 48°24′E
- Country: Azerbaijan
- District: Jalilabad

Population
  - Total: 1,009
- Time zone: UTC+4 (AZT)
  - Summer (DST): UTC+5 (AZT)

Cəfərxanlı (also, Jafarkhanly) is a small village in municipality of Uchtapa village in the Jalilabad District of Azerbaijan. It has a population of 2,017.
