= Qəzvinoba =

- Municipality
- Location within Azerbaijan
- Coordinates: 38°55′13″N 48°40′20″E
- Country: Azerbaijan
- Rayon: Masally

Population
  - Total: 1,070
- Time zone: UTC+4 (AZT)
  - Summer (DST): UTC+5 (AZT)

Qəzvinoba (also, Kazvinoba) is a village and municipality in the Masally Rayon of Azerbaijan. It has a population of 1,070.
