= Həziabad =

Human settlement in Azerbaijan

Coordinates: 39°04′N 48°34′E

Həziabad is a village and municipality in the Jalilabad Rayon of Azerbaijan. It has a population of 1,725.
