= Masallı (village) =

- Village and Municipality
- Country: Azerbaijan
- Rayon: Masally
- Time zone: UTC+4 (AZT)
  - Summer (DST): UTC+5 (AZT)

Masallı is a village and municipality in the Masally Rayon of Azerbaijan. It has a population of 599.
