= Maşlıq =

- Municipality
- Location within Azerbaijan
- Coordinates: 39°11′00″N 48°35′39″E
- Country: Azerbaijan
- Rayon: Jalilabad

Population
  - Total: 3,515
- Time zone: UTC+4 (AZT)
  - Summer (DST): UTC+5 (AZT)

Maşlıq (also, Mashlyk and Mashlykh) is a village and municipality in the Jalilabad Rayon of Azerbaijan. It has a population of 3,515.
