= Karayarka =

- Location within Azerbaijan
- Coordinates: 39°12′55″N 48°37′14″E
- Country: Azerbaijan
- Rayon: Jalilabad
- Time zone: UTC+4 (AZT)
  - Summer (DST): UTC+5 (AZT)

Karayarka (also, Koroyarka) is a village in the Jalilabad Rayon of Azerbaijan.
