= Vənlik =

- Municipality
- Location within Azerbaijan
- Coordinates: 39°05′N 48°29′E
- Country: Azerbaijan
- Rayon: Jalilabad

Population
  - Total: 428
- Time zone: UTC+4 (AZT)

Vənlik (also, Venlik and Vannik) is a village and municipality in the Jalilabad Rayon of Azerbaijan. It has a population of 428.
