= Masallı =

Masalli Masallı
- Masallı
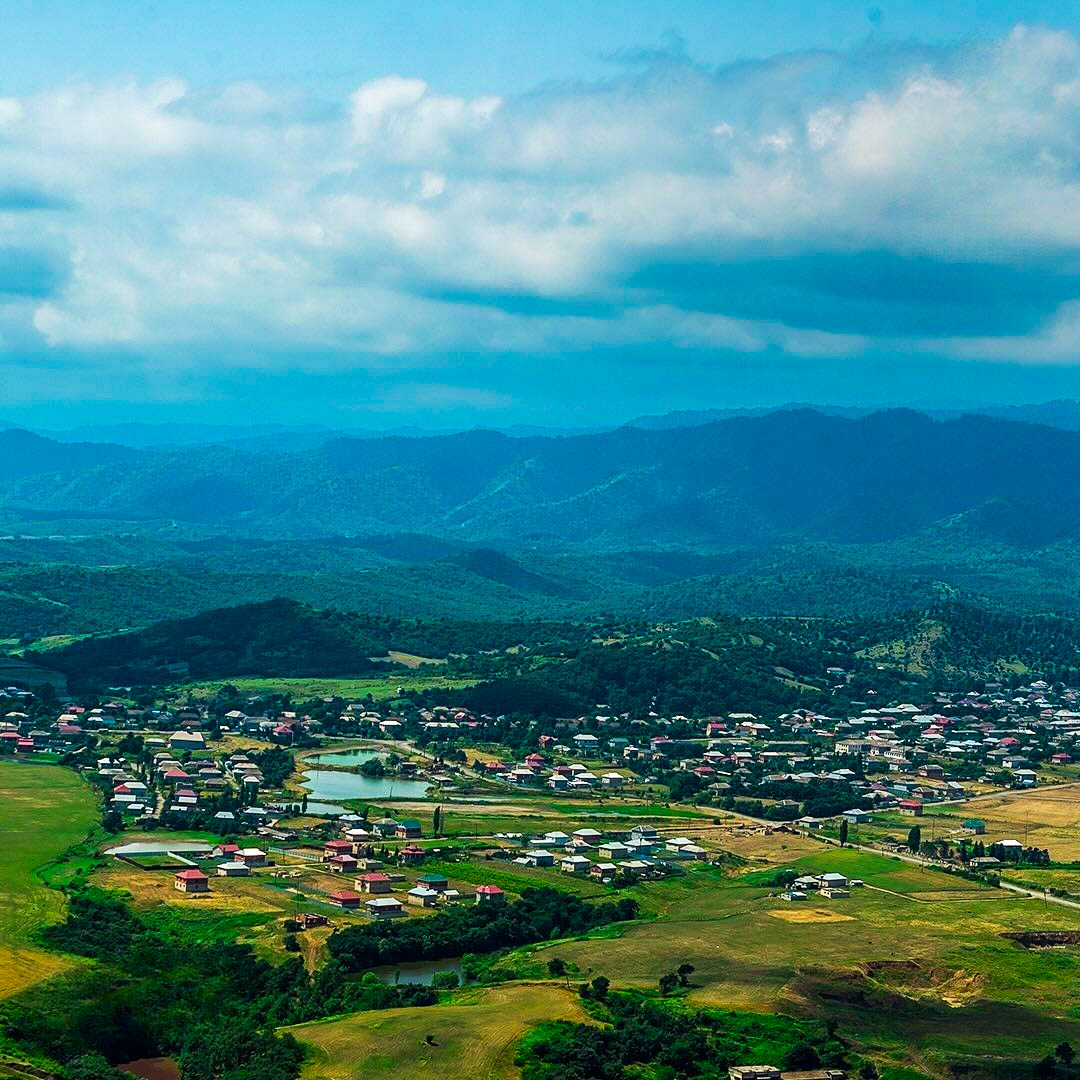

- Location within Azerbaijan
- Coordinates: 39°02′03″N 48°39′56″E
- Country: Azerbaijan
- District: Masally
- Established: 1960

Population (2024)
  - Total: 26,345
- Time zone: UTC+4 (AZT)
- Area code: +994 151

Masalli (Azerbaijani: Masallı) is a city in and the capital of the Masalli District of Azerbaijan.

== History ==
Masalli city was established in 1960. The city is named for the Masal tribe that lived in the territory of Masalli in ancient times.

== Population ==
According to the statistics of 2024, the total population of Masalli city was 15,345.

== Territory ==
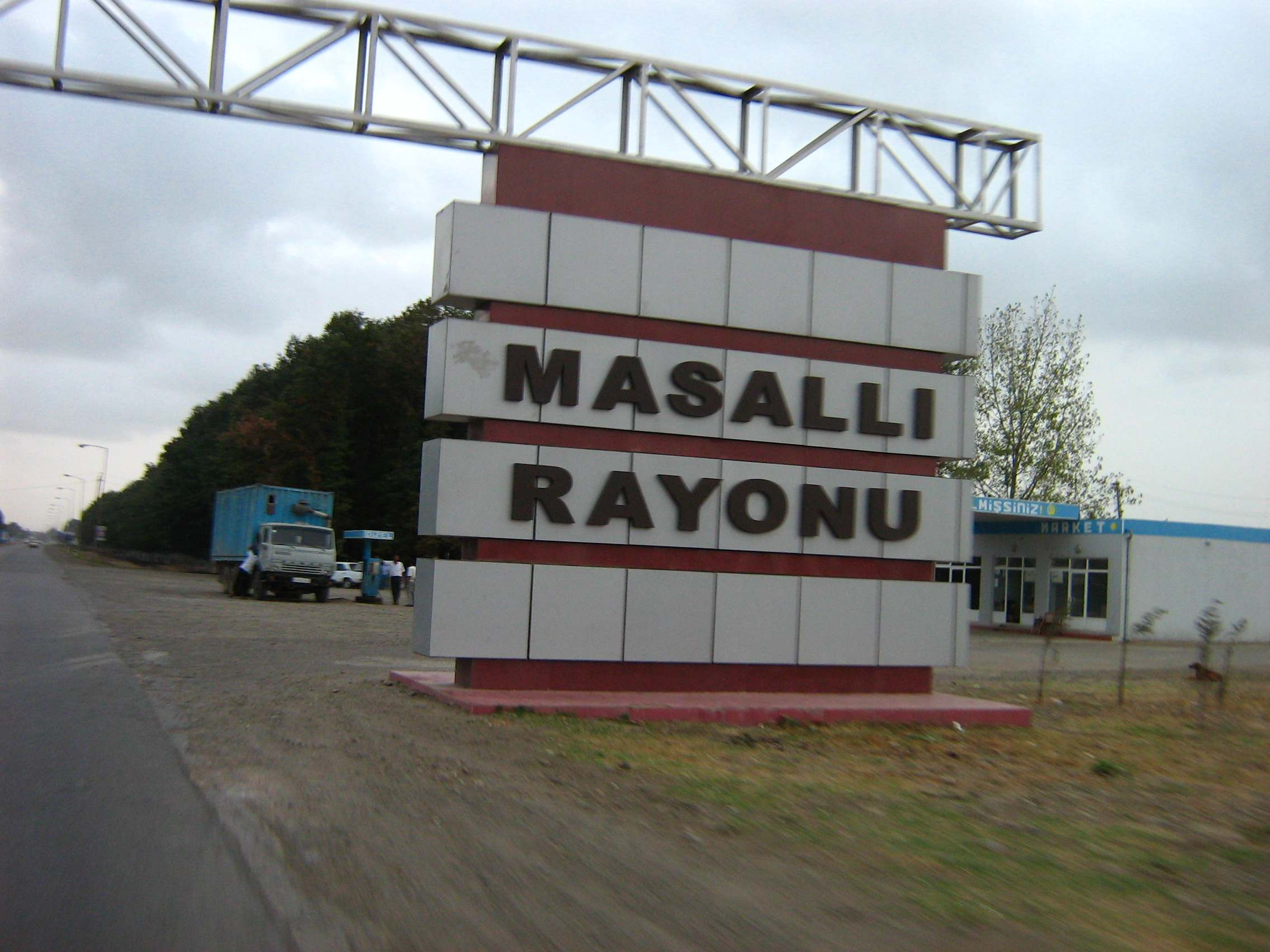
Entrance to Masalli District

By the decree of the president on "Changes to administrative units of Masalli District" dated 15 March 2013, the Gigah, Dadva, Seybatin, and Isgandarli villages of Masalli city were removed from the State register of territorial units of Azerbaijan.

== Historical monuments ==
There are approximately 208 historical, archeological, and architectural monuments in Masalli.

Name	Type	Date
Mosque	architectural	19th century
Nazari Khanym Tomb	architectural	14th century
Amir Tomb	architectural	19th century
Arkivan castle	architectural	9th – 10th centuries
Onjakala castle	architectural	Middle Ages

== Court ==
Masalli District's Court is situated in Masalli city. The initial name of the court was Masalli District People's Court.
