= Ocaqlı =

- Municipality
- Location within Azerbaijan
- Coordinates: 39°15′33″N 48°29′50″E
- Country: Azerbaijan
- Rayon: Jalilabad

Population
  - Total: 4,027
- Time zone: UTC+4 (AZT)
  - Summer (DST): UTC+5 (AZT)

Ocaqlı (also, Odzhagly and Odzhakhly) is a village and municipality in the Jalilabad Rayon of Azerbaijan. It has a population of 4,027.
