= Hacıtəpə =

- Municipality
- Location within Azerbaijan
- Coordinates: 39°08′N 48°42′E
- Country: Azerbaijan
- Rayon: Masally

Population
  - Total: 1,277
- Time zone: UTC+4 (AZT)
  - Summer (DST): UTC+5 (AZT)

Hacıtəpə (also, Gadzhytepe and Gadzhitepe) is a village and municipality in the Masally Rayon of Azerbaijan. It has a population of 1,277.
