= Tomarkhanly =

- Location within Azerbaijan
- Coordinates: 39°16′N 48°16′E
- Country: Azerbaijan
- Rayon: Jalilabad
- Time zone: UTC+4 (AZT)

Tomarkhanly (also, Tamirkhanly and Tomarkhan) is a village in the Jalilabad Rayon of Azerbaijan.
