= Sığıncaq =

Village and municipality in Azerbaijan

Coordinates: 39°07′N 48°40′E

Sığıncaq is a village and municipality in the Masally Rayon of Azerbaijan. It has a population of 1,802.
