= Medeni Ingilab =

- Location within Azerbaijan
- Coordinates: 39°06′N 48°32′E
- Country: Azerbaijan
- Rayon: Jalilabad
- Time zone: UTC+4 (AZT)
  - Summer (DST): UTC+5 (AZT)

Medeni Ingilab (also, Madani-Inglap) is a village in the Jalilabad Rayon of Azerbaijan.
