= Qəriblər =

- Municipality
- Location within Azerbaijan
- Coordinates: 38°59′51″N 48°35′47″E
- Country: Azerbaijan
- Rayon: Masally

Population
  - Total: 1,538
- Time zone: UTC+4 (AZT)
  - Summer (DST): UTC+5 (AZT)

Qəriblər (also, Gariblar and Gariblyar) is a village and municipality in the Masally Rayon of Azerbaijan at 38°59'51" north of the equator and 48°35'47" east of the Prime Meridian. It has a population of 1,538..
