= Boyxanlı =

- Municipality
- Location within Azerbaijan
- Coordinates: 39°14′46″N 48°14′03″E
- Country: Azerbaijan
- Rayon: Jalilabad

Population
  - Total: 1,302
- Time zone: UTC+4 (AZT)
  - Summer (DST): UTC+5 (AZT)

Boyxanlı (also, Bayxanlı, Bayankhanly, and Boykhanly) is a village and municipality in the Jalilabad Rayon of Azerbaijan. It has a population of 1,302.
