= Şatıroba =

- Municipality
- Location within Azerbaijan
- Coordinates: 38°55′04″N 48°43′32″E
- Country: Azerbaijan
- Rayon: Masally

Population
  - Total: 1,670
- Time zone: UTC+4 (AZT)
  - Summer (DST): UTC+5 (AZT)

Şatıroba is a village and municipality in the Masally Rayon of Azerbaijan. It has a population of 1,670.
