= Çünzəli =

Village in Jalilabad Rayon, Azerbaijan

Coordinates: 39°08′N 48°30′E

Çünzəli is a village and municipality in the Jalilabad Rayon of Azerbaijan. It has a population of 849.
