= Yeyənkənd =

- Municipality
- Location within Azerbaijan
- Coordinates: 39°01′40″N 48°36′59″E
- Country: Azerbaijan
- Rayon: Masally

Population
  - Total: 1,329
- Time zone: UTC+4 (AZT)
  - Summer (DST): UTC+5 (AZT)

Yeyənkənd (also, Yegenkend) is a village and municipality in the Masally Rayon of Azerbaijan. It has a population of 1,329.
