= Məşədivəlli =

Village and municipality in Jalilabad Rayon, Azerbaijan

Coordinates: 39°15′N 48°28′E

Məşədivəlli (also, Məşədvəlli) is a village and municipality in the Jalilabad Rayon of Azerbaijan. It has a population of 105.
