= Buravar =

- Municipality
- Location within Azerbaijan
- Coordinates: 39°03′59″N 48°21′05″E
- Country: Azerbaijan
- Rayon: Jalilabad

Population
  - Total: 915
- Time zone: UTC+4 (AZT)
  - Summer (DST): UTC+5 (AZT)

Buravar is a village and municipality in the Jalilabad Rayon of Azerbaijan. It has a population of 915.
