= Uzuntəpə =

- Municipality
- Location within Azerbaijan
- Coordinates: 39°13′02″N 48°36′25″E
- Country: Azerbaijan
- Rayon: Jalilabad

Population
  - Total: 6,150
- Time zone: UTC+4 (AZT)

Uzuntəpə (also, Novogol’sk and Novogolovka) is a village and municipality in the Jalilabad Rayon of Azerbaijan. It has a population of 6,150. The municipality consists of the villages of Uzuntəpə and Novoqolovka.
