= Novoqolovka =

Coordinates: 39°13′52″N 48°38′35″E

Novoqolovka is a former village in the municipality of Uzuntəpə in the Jalilabad Rayon of Azerbaijan.
