= Yeddioymaq, Masally =

Yeddioymaq, Masally may refer to:

- Birinci Yeddioymaq
- İkinci Yeddioymaq
