= Məmmədoba =

- Municipality
- Location within Azerbaijan
- Coordinates: 38°55′24″N 48°38′24″E
- Country: Azerbaijan
- Rayon: Masally

Population
  - Total: 1,272
- Time zone: UTC+4 (AZT)
  - Summer (DST): UTC+5 (AZT)

Məmmədoba (also, Mamadyuba and Mamedoba) is a village and municipality in the Masally Rayon of Azerbaijan. It has a population of 1,272.
