= Məmmədrzaküçə =

- Municipality
- Location within Azerbaijan
- Coordinates: 38°58′N 48°37′E
- Country: Azerbaijan
- Rayon: Masally

Population
  - Total: 534
- Time zone: UTC+4 (AZT)
  - Summer (DST): UTC+5 (AZT)

Məmmədrzaküçə (also, Mamedrzakyudzha and Mamedi-Rzakyudzha) is a village and municipality in the Masally Rayon of Azerbaijan. It has a population of 534.
