= Dəmbəlov =

- Municipality
- Location within Azerbaijan
- Coordinates: 38°58′34″N 48°32′11″E
- Country: Azerbaijan
- Rayon: Masally

Population
  - Total: 95
- Time zone: UTC+4 (AZT)
  - Summer (DST): UTC+5 (AZT)

Dəmbəlov (also, Tambalau) is a village and the least populous municipality in the Masally Rayon of Azerbaijan. It has a population of 95.
