= Komanlı =

- Municipality
- Location within Azerbaijan
- Coordinates: 39°04′59″N 48°32′59″E
- Country: Azerbaijan
- Rayon: Jalilabad

Population
  - Total: 2,696
- Time zone: UTC+4 (AZT)
  - Summer (DST): UTC+5 (AZT)

Komanlı (also, Kemanly and Komanly) is a village and municipality in the Jalilabad Rayon of Azerbaijan. It has a population of 2,696.
