= Xıl =

- Municipality
- Location within Azerbaijan
- Coordinates: 38°58′19″N 48°43′27″E
- Country: Azerbaijan
- Rayon: Masally

Population
  - Total: 3,848
- Time zone: UTC+4 (AZT)
  - Summer (DST): UTC+5 (AZT)

Xıl (also, Khyl) is a village and municipality in the Masally Rayon of Azerbaijan. It has a population of 3,848.

== Notable natives ==
- Elshad Huseynov — National Hero of Azerbaijan.
