= Elmir Bagirov =

Incumbent Mayor of Saatly

Mayor of Saatly
- Incumbent
- Assumed office August 24, 2020
- Preceded by: Nazim Ismaylov

Chief of Staff of the Seaside Boulevard Office
- In office April 20, 2016 – August 24, 2020

Chief of Staff of the State Flag Complex Office under the Cabinet of Ministers of the Republic of Azerbaijan
- In office 2014 – April 20, 2016

Personal details
- Born: April 28, 1980 (age 46) Masally, Azerbaijan SSR, Soviet Union
- Party: New Azerbaijan Party
- Education: Baku State University

Elmir Bagirov (Azerbaijani: Elmir Bağırov) is the head of the executive branch of Saatly District, Azerbaijan. Bagirov holds a Doctor of Philosophy in Political Science.

== Early life and education ==
Bagirov was born on April 28, 1980, in the Hishkadare village of the Masally region. In 1997, he graduated from Elshad Agayev secondary school in Hishkadare village.

In 1997 he matriculated at Baku State University, majoring in political science. After graduating with a bachelor's degree in 2001, he enrolled in a master's degree program in "Political theory of world political processes and international relations" at the Faculty of Political Management of the Academy of Public Administration under the President of the Republic of Azerbaijan.

In 2003, he entered the full-time doctoral program of the same academy, graduating in 2006. In 2008, he defended his doctoral dissertation entitled "Priorities of Azerbaijan's national interests in the Caspian region" under the guidance of professor Seyfaddin Gandilov and was awarded the title of the youngest "Doctor of Philosophy in Political Science" in the country.

== Career ==
Since 2004, he has been the coordinator of the azerbaijan.az project of the Heydar Aliyev Foundation. In 2014, he was promoted to head of the foundation's Humanitarian Programs Department.

In 2016, he became the Chief of Staff of the State Flag Complex Office under the Cabinet of Ministers of the Republic of Azerbaijan. Later, he worked as the chief of staff of the Seaside Boulevard Office under the Cabinet of Ministers of the Republic of Azerbaijan.

Bagirov has been a lecturer at the Department of Political Management and Political Science of the Academy of Public Administration under the President of the Republic of Azerbaijan since 2009 and a senior lecturer at the Department of International Relations and Foreign Policy since 2012.

Since 2017, he has been an associate professor at the Academy of Public Administration under the President of the Republic of Azerbaijan. He has participated and presented at more than 10 international scientific conferences, 24 scientific articles have been published in national and foreign scientific journals.

On August 24, 2020, by the order of the President of the Republic of Azerbaijan Ilham Aliyev, Bagirov was appointed the head of the executive branch of Saatly region
