= Tatyanoba =

- Municipality
- Location within Azerbaijan
- Coordinates: 39°03′N 48°35′E
- Country: Azerbaijan
- Rayon: Masally

Population
  - Total: 1,463
- Time zone: UTC+4 (AZT)
  - Summer (DST): UTC+5 (AZT)

Tatyanoba (also, Tat’yanoba and Tat’yanovka) is a village and municipality in the Masally Rayon of Azerbaijan. It has a population of 1,463.
