= Hacıismayıllı =

- Municipality
- Location within Azerbaijan
- Coordinates: 39°10′N 48°27′E
- Country: Azerbaijan
- Rayon: Jalilabad

Population
  - Total: 492
- Time zone: UTC+4 (AZT)
  - Summer (DST): UTC+5 (AZT)

Hacıismayıllı (also, Gadzhyismailly and Gadzhi-Ismaily) is a village and municipality in the Jalilabad Rayon of Azerbaijan. It has a population of 492.
