= Akhadov =

Akhadov is a surname. Notable people with the surname include:

- Elshad Akhadov (1968–1992), National Hero of Azerbaijan
- Valery Akhadov (born 1945), Soviet and Russian theatre and film director
