= Zaryar =

- Location within Azerbaijan
- Coordinates: 39°21′N 48°19′E
- Country: Azerbaijan
- Rayon: Jalilabad
- Time zone: UTC+4 (AZT)

Zaryar (also, Zar’yar) is a village in the Jalilabad Rayon of Azerbaijan.
