= Korlar =

- Location within Azerbaijan
- Coordinates: 39°16′N 48°19′E
- Country: Azerbaijan
- Rayon: Jalilabad
- Time zone: UTC+4 (AZT)
  - Summer (DST): UTC+5 (AZT)

Korlar is a village in the Jalilabad Rayon of Azerbaijan, close to bordering on Iran's northwestern border.
