= Xanılı =

- Municipality
- Location within Azerbaijan
- Coordinates: 39°12′N 48°21′E
- Country: Azerbaijan
- Rayon: Jalilabad

Population
  - Total: 344
- Time zone: UTC+4 (AZT)

Xanılı (also, Khanyly and Khanuli) is a village and municipality in the Jalilabad Rayon of Azerbaijan. It has a population of 344.
