= Qarakazımlı =

- Municipality
- Location within Azerbaijan
- Coordinates: 39°18′27″N 48°16′39″E
- Country: Azerbaijan
- Rayon: Jalilabad

Population
  - Total: 801
- Time zone: UTC+4 (AZT)
  - Summer (DST): UTC+5 (AZT)

Qarakazımlı (also, Karakyazimli, Karakyazimly, and Karakyazymly) is a village and municipality in the Jalilabad Rayon of Azerbaijan. It has a population of 801.
