= Andreyevka, Azerbaijan =

Andreyevka
- Location within Azerbaijan
- Coordinates: 39°15′38″N 48°31′24″E
- Country: Azerbaijan
- Rayon: Jalilabad
- Time zone: UTC+4 (AZT)

Andreyevka is a village in the Jalilabad Rayon of Azerbaijan.
