= Mədətli =

Village and municipality in Jalilabad Rayon, Azerbaijan

Coordinates: 39°16′N 48°18′E

Mədətli is a village and municipality in the Jalilabad Rayon of Azerbaijan. It has a population of 575.
