= Dostallı =

Human settlement in Azerbaijan

Dostallı is a village and municipality in the Jalilabad Rayon of Azerbaijan. It has a population of 279.
