= Nəzəroba =

- Municipality
- Location within Azerbaijan
- Coordinates: 38°53′06″N 48°39′38″E
- Country: Azerbaijan
- Rayon: Masally

Population
  - Total: 296
- Time zone: UTC+4 (AZT)
  - Summer (DST): UTC+5 (AZT)

Nəzəroba (also, Nazaruba) is a village and municipality in the Masally Rayon of Azerbaijan. It has a population of 296.
