= Meşəkənarı =

Village and municipality in Masally Rayon, Azerbaijan

Coordinates: 39°04′N 48°37′E

Meşəkənarı is a village and municipality in the Masally Rayon of Azerbaijan. It has a population of 471.
