= Əmirtürbə =

- Location within Azerbaijan
- Coordinates: 39°03′N 48°34′E
- Country: Azerbaijan
- Rayon: Masally
- Municipality: Güllütəpə
- Time zone: UTC+4 (AZT)
  - Summer (DST): UTC+5 (AZT)

Əmirtürbə (also, Amirturba) is a village in the Masally Rayon of Azerbaijan. The village forms part of the municipality of Güllütəpə.
