= Qızılavar =

- Municipality
- Location within Azerbaijan
- Coordinates: 38°57′49″N 48°40′42″E
- Country: Azerbaijan
- Rayon: Masally

Population
  - Total: 2,263
- Time zone: UTC+4 (AZT)
  - Summer (DST): UTC+5 (AZT)

Qızılavar (also, Kyzylavar) is a village and municipality in the Masally Rayon of Azerbaijan. It has a population of 3,600.
