= Dövlətalıbəyli =

- Municipality
- Location within Azerbaijan
- Coordinates: 39°12′12″N 48°23′41″E
- Country: Azerbaijan
- Rayon: Jalilabad

Population
  - Total: 375
- Time zone: UTC+4 (AZT)
  - Summer (DST): UTC+5 (AZT)

Dövlətalıbəyli (also, Dövlətəlibəyli, Devlyat-Ali-Beyli, and Dovlyatalybeyli) is a village and municipality in the Jalilabad Rayon of Azerbaijan. It has a population of 375.
