= Bağıroba =

Coordinates: 38°58′N 48°38′E

Bağıroba is a village and municipality in the Masally Rayon of Azerbaijan. It has a population of 1,075.
