= Abdullu =

Coordinates: 39°12′N 48°27′E

Abdullu is a village and municipality in the Jalilabad Rayon of Azerbaijan. It has a population of 545.
