= Sarıcəfərli =

Coordinates: 39°05′N 48°40′E

- Village and Municipality
- Interactive map of Sarıcəfərli
- Country: Azerbaijan
- Rayon: Masally
- 481
- Time zone: UTC+4 (AZT)
  - Summer (DST): UTC+5 (AZT)

Sarıcəfərli is a village and municipality in the Masally Rayon of Azerbaijan. It has a population of 481.
