= Kosagül =

Coordinates: 39°02′N 48°38′E

Kosagül is a village and municipality in the Masally Rayon of Azerbaijan. It has a population of 841.
