= Yarly =

- Location within Azerbaijan
- Coordinates: 39°13′N 48°17′E
- Country: Azerbaijan
- Rayon: Jalilabad
- Elevation: 271 m (889 ft)

Population
  - Total: 8,190
- Time zone: UTC+4 (AZT)
  - Summer (DST): UTC+5 (AZT)

Yarly is a village in the Jalilabad Rayon of Azerbaijan.
