= Allahverənli =

Human settlement in Azerbaijan

Coordinates: 39°09′54″N 48°27′25″E

Allahverənli is a village and municipality in the Jalilabad Rayon of Azerbaijan. It has a population of 331.
