= Bala Təklə =

- Municipality
- Location within Azerbaijan
- Coordinates: 39°05′N 48°42′E
- Country: Azerbaijan
- Rayon: Masally

Population
  - Total: 323
- Time zone: UTC+4 (AZT)
  - Summer (DST): UTC+5 (AZT)

Bala Təklə (also, Bala Teklya and Niahnyaya Taklya) is a village and municipality in the Masally Rayon of Azerbaijan. It has a population of 469.
