= Zopun =

- Municipality
- Location within Azerbaijan
- Coordinates: 39°10′46″N 48°24′31″E
- Country: Azerbaijan
- Rayon: Jalilabad

Population
  - Total: 968
- Time zone: UTC+4 (AZT)

Zopun (also, Zupun) is a village and municipality in the Jalilabad Rayon of Azerbaijan. It has a population of 968.
