= Hasıllı =

Human settlement in Azerbaijan

Coordinates: 39°11′N 48°28′E

Hasıllı is a village and municipality in the Jalilabad Rayon of Azerbaijan. As of the 2009 census, it had a population of 404.
