= Əliqasımlı =

- Municipality
- Location within Azerbaijan
- Coordinates: 39°17′09″N 48°27′20″E
- Country: Azerbaijan
- Rayon: Jalilabad

Population
  - Total: 2,533
- Time zone: UTC+4 (AZT)
  - Summer (DST): UTC+5 (AZT)

Əliqasımlı (also, Alikasumly and Alikasymly) is a village and municipality in the Jalilabad Rayon of Azerbaijan. It has a population of 2,533.

== Notable natives ==
- Arif Gubadov — National Hero of Azerbaijan.
