= Günzəli =

Village and municipality in Jalilabad Rayon, Azerbaijan

Günzəli is a village and municipality in the Jalilabad Rayon of Azerbaijan. It has a population of 5,917.
