= Mişkəmi =

Mishkami
- Municipality
- Location within Azerbaijan
- Coordinates: 38°54′N 48°41′E
- Country: Azerbaijan
- Rayon: Masally

Population
  - Total: 534
- Time zone: UTC+4 (AZT)
  - Summer (DST): UTC+5 (AZT)

Mishkami (also, Mishkemi and Mishkami) is a village and municipality in the Masally Rayon of Azerbaijan. It has a population of 534.
