= Kazakhbarasi =

- Location within Azerbaijan
- Coordinates: 39°22′N 48°47′E
- Country: Azerbaijan
- Rayon: Jalilabad
- Time zone: UTC+4 (AZT)
  - Summer (DST): UTC+5 (AZT)

Kazakhbarasi is a village in the Jalilabad Rayon of Azerbaijan. Kazakhbarasi is a small village located in Azerbaijan, situated approximately 90 km north of Lencoran and 200 km from the capital city. The village is located about 110 km southeast of the Azerbaijan-Iran border. According to the latest census, the population of Kazakhbarasi is around 150 people.

Although Kazakhbarasi itself does not have many tourist attractions, the surrounding areas are rich in natural and cultural landmarks. Some tourist destinations in the region include the Talysh Mountains, Gobustan Rock Art Cultural Landscape, Laton Waterfall, and Ag-Gel National Park.

The Talysh Mountains, located near Kazakhbarasi, are a common destination for hikers and nature lovers. The area is home to a variety of flora and fauna, including rare and endangered species. The Gobustan Rock Art Cultural Landscape, another nearby attraction, is a UNESCO World Heritage Site that features thousands of prehistoric rock engravings and carvings.

The Laton Waterfall is located near the village of Laza and offers views of the surrounding landscape. Finally, the Ag-Gel National Park, located about 60 km from Kazakhbarasi, is a protected area that is home to a variety of wildlife, including the endangered Caucasian leopard.
