= Köarz =

Village and municipality in Jalilabad Rayon, Azerbaijan

Köarz is a village and municipality in the Jalilabad Rayon of Azerbaijan. It has a population of 660.
