= Şabanlı =

- Municipality
- Location within Azerbaijan
- Coordinates: 39°14′51″N 48°22′34″E
- Country: Azerbaijan
- Rayon: Jalilabad

Population
  - Total: 1,253
- Time zone: UTC+4 (AZT)
  - Summer (DST): UTC+5 (AZT)

Şabanlı (also, Shabanli) is a village and municipality in the Jalilabad Rayon of Azerbaijan. It has a population of 1,253.
