= İncilli =

- Municipality
- Location within Azerbaijan
- Coordinates: 39°08′16″N 48°26′04″E
- Country: Azerbaijan
- Rayon: Jalilabad

Population
  - Total: 608
- Time zone: UTC+4 (AZT)
  - Summer (DST): UTC+5 (AZT)

İncilli (also, Indzhilli and Inzhilli) is a village and municipality in the Jalilabad Rayon of Azerbaijan. It has a population of 608.
