= Qədirli, Masally =

Qədirli
- Municipality
- Location within Azerbaijan
- Coordinates: 39°04′28″N 48°46′59″E
- Country: Azerbaijan
- Rayon: Masally

Population
  - Total: 883
- Time zone: UTC+4 (AZT)
  - Summer (DST): UTC+5 (AZT)

Qədirli (also, Kadirli and Kadyrly) is a village and municipality in the Masally Rayon of Azerbaijan. It has a population of 883.
