= Sabirabad, Jalilabad =

Sabirabad
- Municipality
- Location within Azerbaijan
- Coordinates: 39°15′43″N 48°31′59″E
- Country: Azerbaijan
- Rayon: Jalilabad

Population
  - Total: 3,577
- Time zone: UTC+4 (AZT)
  - Summer (DST): UTC+5 (AZT)

Sabirabad is a village and municipality in the Jalilabad Rayon of Azerbaijan. It has a population of 3,577.
