= Seybətin =

- Municipality
- Location within Azerbaijan
- Coordinates: 39°03′N 48°41′E
- Country: Azerbaijan
- Rayon: Masally

Population
  - Total: 1,321
- Time zone: UTC+4 (AZT)
  - Summer (DST): UTC+5 (AZT)

Seybətin (also, Seybetin and Seyfadyn) is a village and municipality in the Masally Rayon of Azerbaijan. It has a population of 1,321.
