= Banbaşı =

- Municipality
- Location within Azerbaijan
- Coordinates: 39°02′25″N 48°37′39″E
- Country: Azerbaijan
- Rayon: Masally

Population
  - Total: 2,290
- Time zone: UTC+4 (AZT)
  - Summer (DST): UTC+5 (AZT)

Banbaşı (also, Bambashi, Banbashi, and Banbashy) is a village and municipality in the Masally Rayon of Azerbaijan. It has a population of 2,290.
