= Bəcirəvan, Jalilabad =

Bëyuk Badzhiravan
- Municipality
- Location within Azerbaijan
- Coordinates: 39°06′01″N 48°32′15″E
- Country: Azerbaijan
- Rayon: Jalilabad

Population
  - Total: 2,322
- Time zone: UTC+4 (AZT)
  - Summer (DST): UTC+5 (AZT)

Bëyuk Badzhiravan (also, Bol’shoy Badzhiravan) is a village and municipality in the Jalilabad Rayon of Azerbaijan. It has a population of 2,322.
