= Molalan, Masally =

Molalan
- Municipality
- Location within Azerbaijan
- Coordinates: 38°54′N 48°45′E
- Country: Azerbaijan
- Rayon: Masally

Population
  - Total: 395
- Time zone: UTC+4 (AZT)
  - Summer (DST): UTC+5 (AZT)

Molalan (also, Mololan) is a village and municipality in the Masally Rayon of Azerbaijan. It has a population of 395.
