= Köhnə Alvadı =

- Municipality
- Location within Azerbaijan
- Coordinates: 39°02′51″N 48°38′18″E
- Country: Azerbaijan
- Rayon: Masally

Population
  - Total: 3,496
- Time zone: UTC+4 (AZT)
  - Summer (DST): UTC+5 (AZT)

Köhnə Alvadı (also, Këgna Alvady and Staryye Alvady) is a village and municipality in the Masally Rayon of Azerbaijan. It has a population of 3,496.
