= Elshad Akhadov =

Decorated Azerbaijani soldier (1968–1993)

- Elşad Əhədov
- Born: March 4, 1968; Təzə Alvadı, Masally District, Azerbaijan SSR
- Died: December 11, 1993 (aged 25); Aghdash Upland, Azerbaijan
- Military career
- Allegiance: Azerbaijan
- Branch: Azerbaijani Armed Forces
- Rank: Commander of the company
- Conflicts: First Nagorno-Karabakh War
- Awards: National Hero of Azerbaijan; 1994

Elshad Akhadov (Azerbaijani: Elşad Əhədov; 4 March 1968, Təzə Alvadı, Masally District, Azerbaijan SSR – 11 December 1992, Aghdash Upland, Azerbaijan) was the National Hero of Azerbaijan and warrior during the First Nagorno-Karabakh War.

== Early life and education ==
Elshad Akhadov was born on 4 March 1968 in Taza Alvady village of Masally District in Azerbaijan SSR. He graduated from the secondary school therein. Then he attended Jamshid Nakhchivanski Military Lyceum. Akhadov was a graduate of Kamianets-Podilskyi High Commanders School. In 1989 he was appointed the commander of one of the Volgograd military units.

== First Nagorno-Karabakh War ==
Returning to his homeland, Elshad worked at first as a company commander in the Guzdak settlement of Baku and then in the Lankaran district. When the Armenian offensive started he fought in battles around Füzuli, Aşağı Veysəlli, Shishkaya and in other war zones. His last battle was for the Aghdash Upland, and on December 11, 1993, he lost his life heroically in that battle.

He was buried in Taza Alvady.

== Personal life ==
He was married and had two children.

== Honors ==
Elshad Akhadov was posthumously awarded the Azerbaijani Flag Order under Presidential Decree dated 14 December 1993 and the title of the "National Hero of Azerbaijan" under Presidential Decree No. 203 dated 16 September 1994.

Taza Alvady village high school and park therein are named after him.

== See also ==
- First Nagorno-Karabakh War
- List of National Heroes of Azerbaijan
