= Alaşar =

- Municipality
- Location within Azerbaijan
- Coordinates: 39°01′47″N 48°30′52″E
- Country: Azerbaijan
- Rayon: Jalilabad

Population
  - Total: 372
- Time zone: UTC+4 (AZT)

Alaşar (also, Alashar) is a village and municipality in the Jalilabad Rayon of Azerbaijan. It has a population of 372.
