= Dadva =

- Municipality
- Location within Azerbaijan
- Coordinates: 39°02′N 48°40′E
- Country: Azerbaijan
- Rayon: Masally

Population
  - Total: 4,233
- Time zone: UTC+4 (AZT)
  - Summer (DST): UTC+5 (AZT)

Dadva is a village and municipality in the Masally Rayon of Azerbaijan. It has a population of 4,233.
