= Novomikhaylovka, Kuyurgazinsky District, Republic of Bashkortostan =

Novomikhaylovka Новомихайловка
- Village
- Location within Bashkortostan Location within Russia
- Coordinates: 52°38′N 56°11′E
- Country: Russia
- Region: Bashkortostan
- District: Kuyurgazinsky District
- Time zone: UTC+5:00

Novomikhaylovka (Russian: Новомихайловка) is a rural locality (a village) in Krivle-Ilyushkinsky Selsoviet, Kuyurgazinsky District, Bashkortostan, Russia. The population was 2 as of 2010. There is 1 street.

== Geography ==
Novomikhaylovka is located 34 km east of Yermolayevo (the district's administrative centre) by road. Kinzyabayevo is the nearest rural locality.
