= Novomikhaylovka, Miyakinsky District, Republic of Bashkortostan =

Novomikhaylovka Новомихайловка
- Village
- Location within Bashkortostan Location within Russia
- Coordinates: 53°41′N 54°29′E
- Country: Russia
- Region: Bashkortostan
- District: Miyakinsky District
- Time zone: UTC+5:00

Novomikhaylovka (Russian: Новомихайловка) is a rural locality (a village) in Meneuztamaksky Selsoviet, Miyakinsky District, Bashkortostan, Russia. The population was 55 as of 2010. There is 1 street.

== Geography ==
Novomikhaylovka is located 27 km northwest of Kirgiz-Miyaki (the district's administrative centre) by road. Meneuztamak is the nearest rural locality.
