= Novomikhaylovka, Chishminsky District, Republic of Bashkortostan =

Novomikhaylovka Новомихайловка
- Village
- Location within Bashkortostan Location within Russia
- Coordinates: 54°37′N 55°35′E
- Country: Russia
- Region: Bashkortostan
- District: Chishminsky District
- Time zone: UTC+5:00

Novomikhaylovka (Russian: Новомихайловка) is a rural locality (a village) in Alkinsky Selsoviet, Chishminsky District, Bashkortostan, Russia. The village has 11 streets and, as of 2010, a population of 62.

== Geography ==
Novomikhaylovka is located 28 km east of Chishmy, the district's administrative centre. Selo sanatoriya Alkino is the nearest rural locality.
