= Novomikhaylovka, Loktevsky District, Altai Krai =

Novomikhaylovka Новомихайловка
- Selo
- Location within Altai Krai Location within Russia
- Coordinates: 51°08′N 81°12′E
- Country: Russia
- Region: Altai Krai
- District: Loktevsky District
- Time zone: UTC+7:00

Novomikhaylovka (Russian: Новомихайловка) is a rural locality (a selo) in Novomikhaylovsky Selsoviet, Loktevsky District, Altai Krai, Russia. The population was 216 as of 2013. There are 7 streets.

== Geography ==
Novomikhaylovka is located 28 km northwest of Gornyak (the district's administrative centre) by road. Removsky is the nearest rural locality.
