= İkinci Yeddioymaq =

- Municipality
- Location within Azerbaijan
- Coordinates: 38°59′27″N 48°45′27″E
- Country: Azerbaijan
- Rayon: Masally

Population
  - Total: 1,070
- Time zone: UTC+4 (AZT)
  - Summer (DST): UTC+5 (AZT)

İkinci Yeddioymaq (also, Yeddioymak, Yeddioymak Vtoroye, and Yeddy-Oymag Vtoroye) is a village and municipality in the Masally Rayon of Azerbaijan.

== Demographics ==
Currently, the municipality has a population of 1,070.
