= Badlan =

Badlan بادلان
- Village
- Location within Iran
- Coordinates: 31°35′36″N 50°20′16″E
- Country: Iran
- Province: Khuzestan
- County: Izeh
- Bakhsh: Dehdez
- Rural District: Donbaleh Rud-e Jonubi

Population (2006)
  - Total: 155
- Time zone: UTC+3:30 (IRST)
  - Summer (DST): UTC+4:30 (IRDT)

Badlan (Persian: بادلان, also Romanized as Badlān, Badalan, and Bādelān; also known as Bādlūn) is a village in Donbaleh Rud-e Jonubi Rural District, Dehdez District, Izeh County, Khuzestan Province, Iran. At the 2006 census, its population was 155, in 21 families.
