= Zahmatabad, Qaleh Ganj =

Zahmatabad زحمت اباد
- Village
- Location within Iran
- Coordinates: 26°50′38″N 58°21′51″E
- Country: Iran
- Province: Kerman
- County: Qaleh Ganj
- Bakhsh: Chah Dadkhoda
- Rural District: Marz

Population (2006)
  - Total: 16
- Time zone: UTC+3:30 (IRST)
  - Summer (DST): UTC+4:30 (IRDT)

Zahmatabad (Persian: زحمت اباد, also Romanized as Zaḩmatābād) is a village in Marz Rural District, Chah Dadkhoda District, Qaleh Ganj County, Kerman Province, Iran. At the 2006 census, its population was 16, in 5 families.
