= Qədirli, Tovuz =

Qədirli
- Municipality
- Location within Azerbaijan
- Coordinates: 41°03′N 45°39′E
- Country: Azerbaijan
- Rayon: Tovuz

Population
  - Total: 1,469
- Time zone: UTC+4 (AZT)
  - Summer (DST): UTC+5 (AZT)

Qədirli (also, Kadirli and Kadyrly) is a village and municipality in the Tovuz Rayon of Azerbaijan. It has a population of 1,469.
