= Molalan, Lerik =

Molalan
- Municipality
- Location within Azerbaijan
- Coordinates: 38°50′51″N 48°22′44″E
- Country: Azerbaijan
- Rayon: Lerik

Population
  - Total: 1,035
- Time zone: UTC+4 (AZT)
  - Summer (DST): UTC+5 (AZT)

Molalan (also, Mulalan) is a village and municipality in the Lerik Rayon of Azerbaijan. It has a population of 1,035.
