= Birinci Yeddioymaq =

Yeddioymaq
- Municipality
- Location within Azerbaijan
- Coordinates: 39°02′N 48°46′E
- Country: Azerbaijan
- Rayon: Masally

Population
  - Total: 1,736
- Time zone: UTC+4 (AZT)
  - Summer (DST): UTC+5 (AZT)

Birinci Yeddioymaq (also, Yeddioymaq, Yeddioymak Pervoye, and Yeddy-Oymag Pervoye) is a village and municipality in the Masally Rayon of Azerbaijan. It has a population of 1,736.
