= Zəhmətabad, Jalilabad =

Zəhmətabad
- Municipality
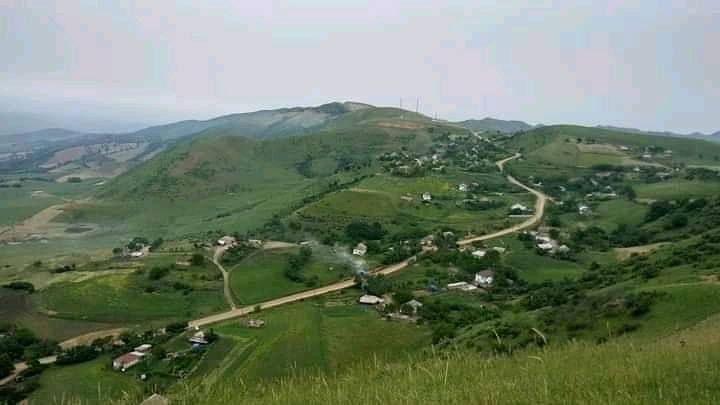

- Location within Azerbaijan
- Coordinates: 39°08′48″N 48°17′15″E
- Country: Azerbaijan
- Rayon: Jalilabad

Population
  - Total: 589
- Time zone: UTC+4 (AZT)

Zəhmətabad (also, Zakhmetabad and Zakhmet-Abod) is a village and municipality in the Jalilabad Rayon of Azerbaijan. It has a population of 589.
