= Yeddioymaq, Bilasuvar =

Yeddioymaq
- Location within Azerbaijan
- Coordinates: 39°39′33″N 48°05′09″E
- Country: Azerbaijan
- Rayon: Bilasuvar
- Time zone: UTC+4 (AZT)
  - Summer (DST): UTC+5 (AZT)

Yeddioymaq is a village in the Bilasuvar Rayon of Azerbaijan. Its elevation is 3 meters (9.84 ft) above sea level and has around 5.07 mm (0.2 in) of precipitation yearly. It has a mid-latitude steppe climate.
