= Bədəlan =

- Municipality
- Location within Azerbaijan
- Coordinates: 38°56′58″N 48°41′15″E
- Country: Azerbaijan
- Rayon: Masally

Population
  - Total: 2,250
- Time zone: UTC+4 (AZT)
  - Summer (DST): UTC+5 (AZT)

Bədəlan (also, Bedalan and Bedelan) is a village and municipality in the Masally Rayon of Azerbaijan. It has a population of 2,250.

== Demographics ==
- Idris Khalilov (Azerbaijani: İdris Xəlilov) is an Azerbaijani cardiologist.
