= Novomikhaylovka, Fyodorovsky District, Republic of Bashkortostan =

Novomikhaylovka Новомихайловка
- Village
- Location within Bashkortostan Location within Russia
- Coordinates: 53°02′N 55°07′E
- Country: Russia
- Region: Bashkortostan
- District: Fyodorovsky District
- Time zone: UTC+5:00

Novomikhaylovka (Russian: Новомихайловка) is a rural locality (a village) in Deniskinsky Selsoviet, Fyodorovsky District, Bashkortostan, Russia. The population was 64 as of 2010. There is 1 street.

== Geography ==
Novomikhaylovka is located 20 km southwest of Fyodorovka (the district's administrative centre) by road. Noaya Derevnya is the nearest rural locality.
