= Təzə Alvadı =

- Municipality
- Location within Azerbaijan
- Coordinates: 39°05′34″N 48°36′23″E
- Country: Azerbaijan
- Rayon: Masally

Population
  - Total: 5,994
- Time zone: UTC+4 (AZT)

Təzə Alvadı (also Teze Alvadi and Taza Alvady) is a village and municipality in the Masally Rayon of Azerbaijan. It has a population of 5,994.

== Notable natives ==
- Elshad Akhadov — National Hero of Azerbaijan.
