= Novomikhaylovka, Amur Oblast =

Novomikhaylovka Новомихайловка
- Selo
- Location within Amur Oblast Location within Russia
- Coordinates: 50°13′N 129°15′E
- Country: Russia
- Region: Amur Oblast
- District: Oktyabrsky District
- Time zone: UTC+9:00

Novomikhaylovka (Russian: Новомихайловка) is a rural locality (a selo) and the administrative center of Novomikhaylovsky Selsoviet of Oktyabrsky District, Amur Oblast, Russia. The population was 416 as of 2018. There are 8 streets.

== Geography ==
Novomikhaylovka is located 22 km southeast of Yekaterinoslavka (the district's administrative centre) by road. Sergeye-Fyodorovka is the nearest rural locality.
