= İsgəndərli, Shamkir =

Coordinates: 39°45′36.5″N 47°45′32.2″E

İsgəndərli is a village and municipality in the Shamkir Rayon of Azerbaijan. It has a population of 545.
