= Novomikhaylovka, Duvansky District, Republic of Bashkortostan =

Novomikhaylovka Новомихайловка
- Village
- Location within Bashkortostan Location within Russia
- Coordinates: 55°31′N 57°53′E
- Country: Russia
- Region: Bashkortostan
- District: Duvansky District
- Time zone: UTC+5:00

Novomikhaylovka (Russian: Новомихайловка) is a rural locality (a village) in Mikhaylovsky Selsoviet, Duvansky District, Bashkortostan, Russia. The population was 176 as of 2010. There are 3 streets.

== Geography ==
Novomikhaylovka is located 30 km west of Mesyagutovo (the district's administrative centre) by road. Mikhaylovka is the nearest rural locality.
