= İsgəndərli, Masally =

İsgəndərli
- Municipality
- Location within Azerbaijan
- Coordinates: 39°01′N 48°40′E
- Country: Azerbaijan
- Rayon: Masally

Population
  - Total: 2,378
- Time zone: UTC+4 (AZT)
  - Summer (DST): UTC+5 (AZT)

İsgəndərli (also, Iskenderli and Iskandarry) is a village and municipality in the Masally Rayon of Azerbaijan. It has a population of 2,378.
