= Zəhmətabad, Bilasuvar =

Zəhmətabad
- Municipality
- Location within Azerbaijan
- Coordinates: 39°28′37″N 48°34′35″E
- Country: Azerbaijan
- Rayon: Bilasuvar

Population
  - Total: 4,159
- Time zone: UTC+4 (AZT)
  - Summer (DST): UTC+5 (AZT)

Zəhmətabad (known as Novomikhaylovka until 1991) is a village and municipality in the Bilasuvar Rayon of Azerbaijan. It has a population of 4159.
