= Masally District =

District in southeastern Azerbaijan

Coordinates: 39°02′N 48°39′E

Masally District Masallı rayonu
- District
- Map of Azerbaijan showing Masally District
- Country: Azerbaijan
- Region: Lankaran-Astara
- Established: 8 August 1930
- Capital: Masally
- Settlements: 103

Government
  - Governor: Araz Ahmedov

Area
  - Total: 720 km^{2} (280 sq mi)

Population (2020)
  - Total: 227,700
  - Density: 320/km^{2} (820/sq mi)
- Time zone: UTC+4 (AZT)
- Postal code: 4400
- Website: masalli-ih.gov.az

Masally District (Azerbaijani: Masallı rayonu) is one of the 66 districts of Azerbaijan. It is located in the southeast of the country and belongs to the Lankaran-Astara Economic Region. The district borders the districts of Lankaran, Lerik, Yardimli, Jalilabad, and Neftchala. Its capital and largest city is Masally. As of 2020, the district had a population of 227,700.

== Geography ==
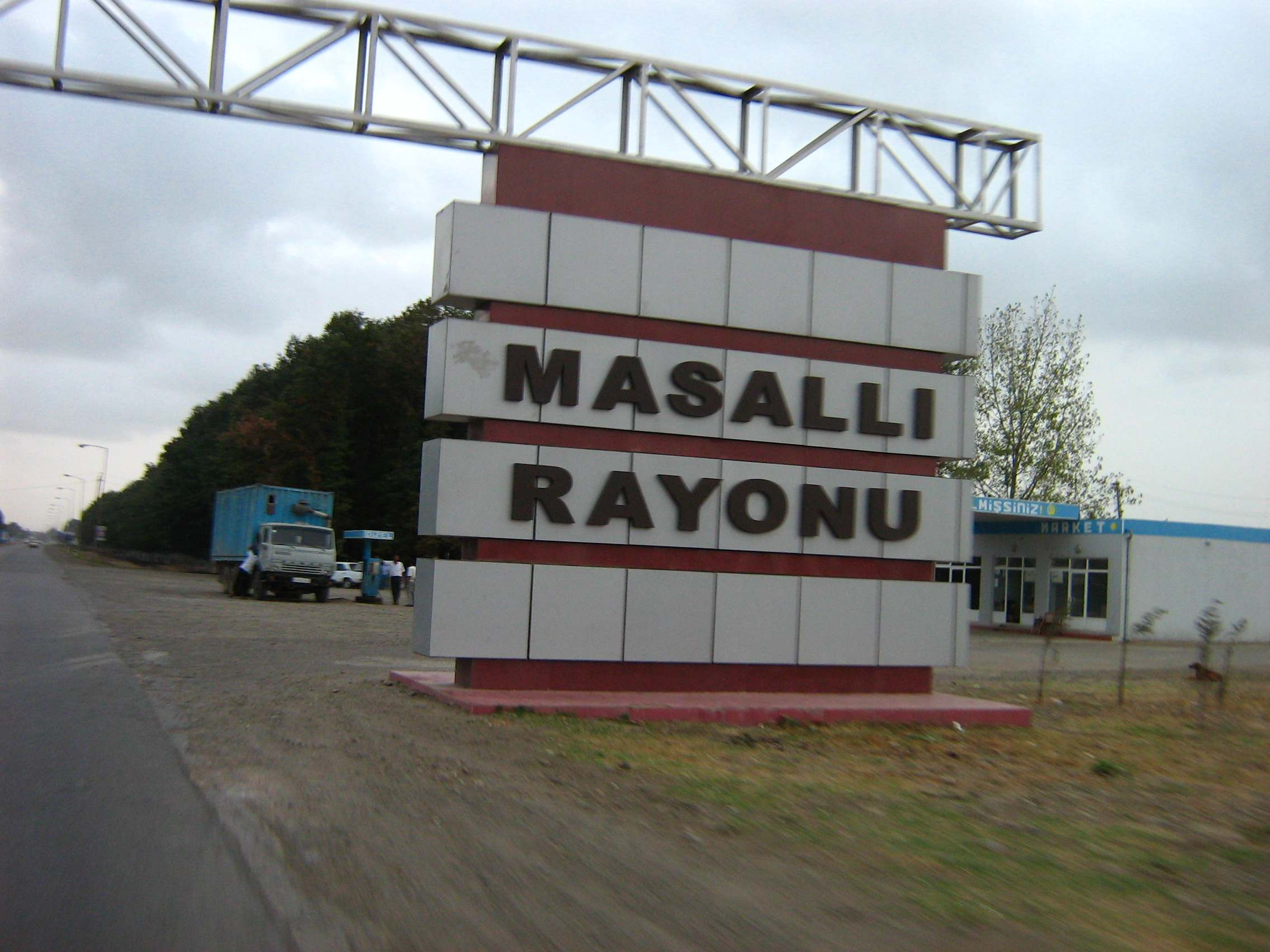
Road sign at the entrance to Masally District

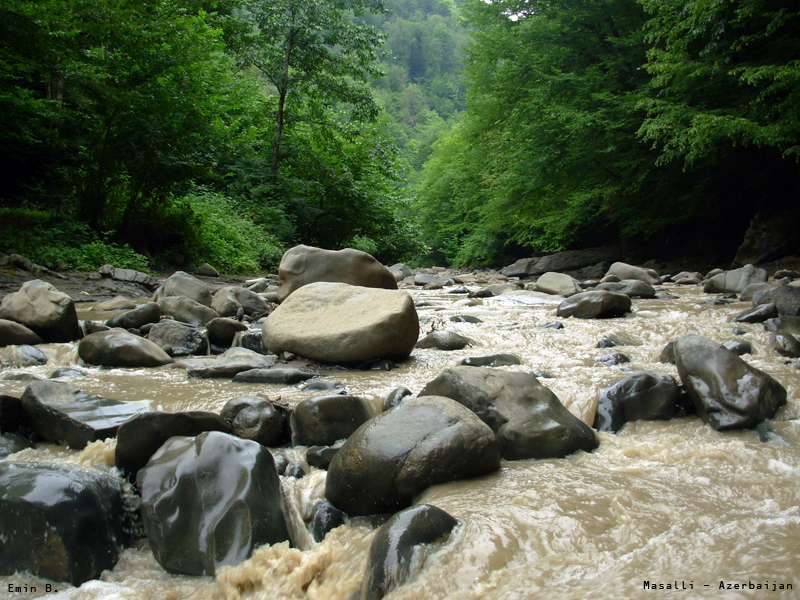
Wilderness in Masally District

In the east, the district is washed by the Caspian Sea, and in the west it approaches Talysh Mountains, Burovar ridge. Height of the territory reaches 917 metres (3,009 ft). There are mineral and geothermal springs in Masally. Average temperature is 2.1 °C (35.8 °F) in January, and 24.6 °C (76.3 °F) in July. The amount of annual precipitation is 600–800 millimetres (24–31 in). The Vilash is the largest river of the district. There are broad-leaved forests of Girkan type-chestnut-leaved oak, hornbeam, beech, Persian ironwood tree, Girkan boxwood, Caucasian persimmon, medlar and others in the mountainous part of the district. Total area of the district's forests equals 16,870 hectares (41,700 acres). There are 107 villages in Masally.

== History ==
Masally district was established in 1930. Formerly, the territory of the district was part of Arkevan area of Lankaran District. Before that, the territory of the district belonged to ancient Manna and Atropatena states. It was included in Talysh Khanate in the middle of the 18th century.

== Politics ==
The head of Masally District is chief executive. Chief executives:

- Safarov Azer Fattah oghlu-till September 30, 2004
- Aliyev Ogtay Jalil oghlu-from September 30, 2004, to September 29, 2006
- Aghayev Gazanfar Arif oghlu-since September 30, 2006
- Huseynov Rafil İsrafil oghlu-since April 14, 2012

== Administrative structure ==
The center of the district is the city of Masally. The average population density is 159 people per km^{2}. Boradigah township, Badalan, Arkevan, Banbashi, Gizilagaj, Teze Alvadi, and Chakhirli villages are the other largest population aggregates.

== Population ==
Ethnic groups in Masally (2019)
1. Azerbaijanis (92.0%)
2. Talysh (7.90%)
3. Other (0.10%)

According to data of 2020, the population of the rayon consists of 228,977 people; 92% are Azerbaijanis and 7.9% are the Talysh people.

Total	including:		Urban places	including:		Rural places	including:	
Total	men	women	Urban places	men	women	Rural places	men	women
228,977	116,408	112,569	51,907	26,679	25,229	177,070	89,730	87,340

== Territory ==
The total area of the district is 72,097 ha. 22,783 ha (31.6%) of the territory belongs to the state. 16,663 hectares (41,180 acres) (73.1%) of this area is covered with forests, which Forest Agriculture department owns 15,960 ha, and the rest 703 hectares (1,740 acres) is for the domestic economy. 440 hectares (1,100 acres) (1.9%) area is included to water fund and 4,609 hectares (11,390 acres) (20.02%) area belongs to the state reserve fund.

Municipality owns 18,738 hectares (46,300 acres) (26.0%) of the area. 560 hectares (1,400 acres) of this territory is for the perspective development of municipality bodies and 1,393 ha of area belongs to the reserve fund of the municipality.

30,576 hectares (75,550 acres) (42.4%) of the area is private property. 26,911 hectares (66,500 acres) (88%) of the territory is privatized and 3,665 hectares (9,060 acres) (12%) belong to the local people.

== Economy ==
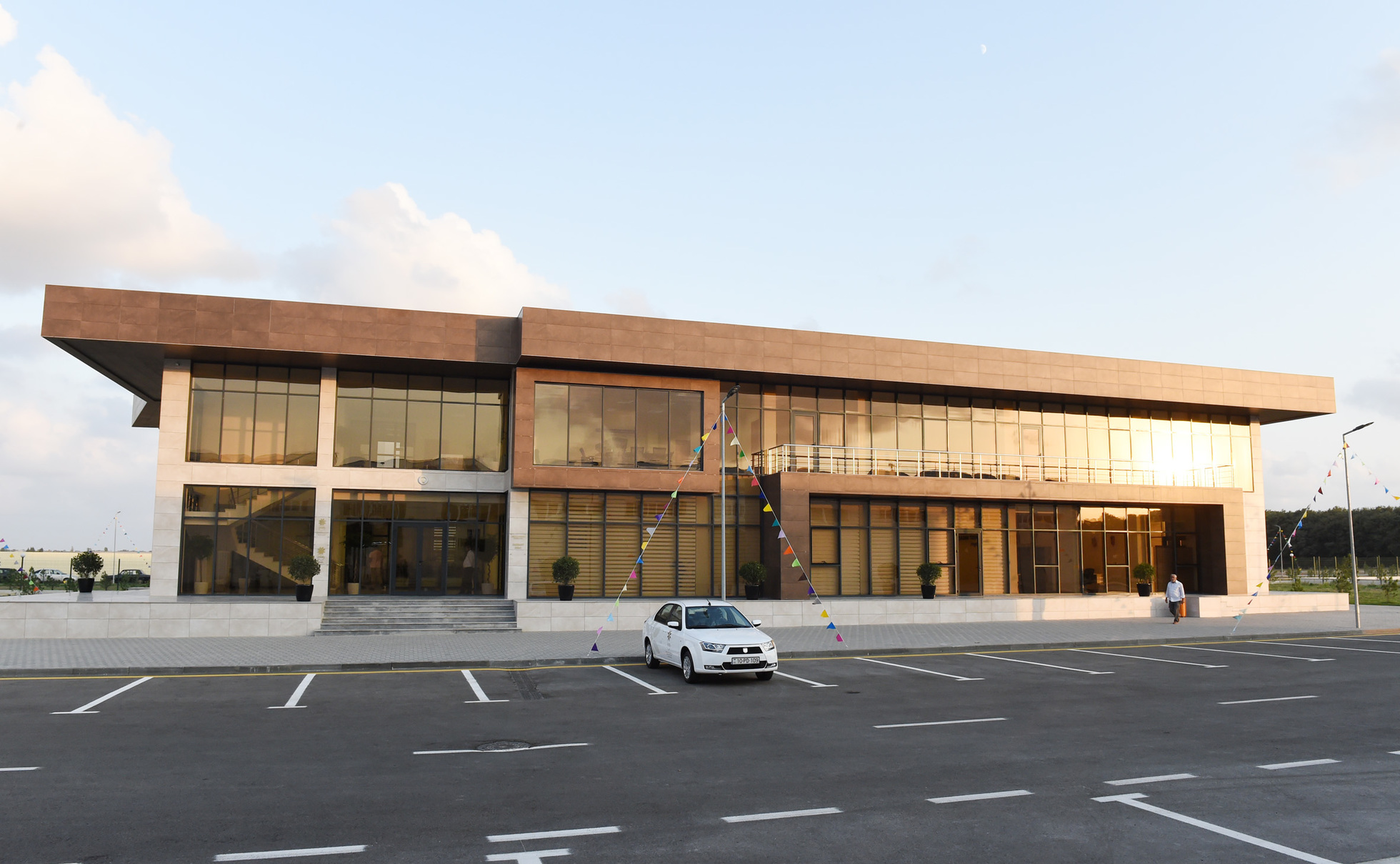
Masalli Industrial Park

A decree of the President dated 15 March 2012 granted 2.0 million manats to the executive of Masally District for the acceleration of the socio-economic development in the region.

Agriculture, construction, industry, transportation, and telecommunication are the cores of economy in Masally district.

=== Agriculture ===
Statistics of agriculture in Masally district
	2010	2012	2013	2014	2015	2016
Total area of agricultural crops (ha)
Cereal corps	11,092	11,790	10,624	11,906	12,432	12,124
including wheat	8,395	8,809	7,604	8,166	8,144	8,141
Tobacco	-	-	-	-	-	14
Sunflower	143	90	90	70	67	62
Potato	2,118	2,276	1,477	1,460	1,282	1,044
Vegetable	3,070	2,798	2,805	2,547	2,542	2,543
Garden plants	635	577	586	519	515	493
Fruit and berry	443	471	483	492	507	537
Grape	21	21	21	21	24	25
Tea	5	5	5	22	40	43
Production of main agricultural products (ton)
Cereal corps	16,059	26,968	24,569	28,163	30,116	30,428
including wheat	10,692	20,385	17,895	19,307	19,871	21,015
Tobacco	-	-	-	-	-	10
Sunflower	229	171	163	123	121	110
Potato	28,257	30,482	32,174	18,103	19,219	15,382
Vegetable	77,281	76,555	70,299	61,987	62,261	63,113
Garden plants	7,578	7,191	6,903	6,235	6,403	6,560
Fruit and berry	2,139	2,527	2,355	2,339	2,347	2,343
Grape	736	875	882	948	953	1,115
Tea	-	-	-	15	3	3
Productivity of agricultural products (centner/ha)
Cereal corps	14.5	22.9	23.1	23.7	24.2	25.1
including wheat	12.7	23.1	23.5	23.6	24.4	25.8
Tobacco	-	-	-	-	-	7.0
Sunflower	16.3	19.4	18.5	18.2	18.8	18.3
Potato	133	134	218	124	150	147
Vegetable	244	270	245	235	244	247
Garden plants	119	125	118	120	124	133
Fruit and berry	61.5	69.9	60.4	58.9	56.5	52.9
Grape	92.9	76.8	80.0	80.0	80.0	91.4
Tea	-	-	-	30.0	6.0	6.0
Number of cattle
Large cattle	69,338	73,060	74,088	73,007	73,145	73,217
including cow and buffalo	34,943	36,308	36,619	36,488	36,448	36,495
Sheep and goats	75,678	79,912	83,000	82,451	84,769	84,942
Birds	526,474	496,009	501,041	489,812	495,485	509,510
Bee families	3,450	3,714	3,833	3,949	4,102	4,325
Production of cattle products (ton)
Meat	3,219	3,226	3,231	3,264	3,299	3,327
Milk	42,223	45,289	48,575	48,960	49,018	49,872
Eggs (in thousand)	51,578	52,440	55,200	55,890	56,264	56,666
Wool (in physical weight)	98	99	99	99	99	99

=== Construction ===
Statistics of construction in Masally district
	2010	2012	2013	2014	2015	2016
Given into usage:
Main funds (thousand manats)	9,898.0	30,545.5	30,428.8	15,022.7	14,360.7	46,614.5
Houses, total area (thousand square meters)	18.5	16.4	20.3	20.3	24.9	21.0
of which private houses	13.9	16.4	20.3	20.2	24.9	21.0
Investments in main capital (thousand manat)	17,948.0	24,883.7	28,287.9	65,576.8	86,206.7	111,888.6
including:						
construction works	17,085.6	23,452.2	26,654.2	62,268.2	81,246.9	100,539.3
Number of construction companies	3	6	7	5	5	3

=== Industry ===
In January–December 2015, there was 37,366 thousand manats worth of goods and service production in the Masally industry. The production was 4.6% higher than that in the previous year. 85.1% of the total industrial production was goods, with the remaining 14.9% being services.

=== Transportation ===
In 2015, cargo transportation by automobiles was 2,368 thousand ton. It is 113 thousand ton more than the previous year. Transportation of passengers was 13,324 thousand persons, which is 813 thousand people more than the previous years. The total worth of transportation was 10,832,4 thousand manats in 2015.

=== Telecommunication ===
In 2015, the total worth of telecommunication services was 1,375 thousand manats. It is 5.4% more than the previous year.

== Museums ==
=== Museum of History and Local Lore ===
The construction of the museum stated in 2014 and completed in 2016. The president Ilham Aliyev attended the opening of the museum. The museum has an exhibition hall, administrative room, ideological center, fund, and drawing gallery.

=== Museum of History and Regional Studies ===
The museum has more than 7,000 exhibits, which illustrates the history of Masally from Eneolithic period to the 20th century. Exhibits include sculptures, carvings, drawings, clothing, photos, arts, crafts, and documents.

== Gallery ==
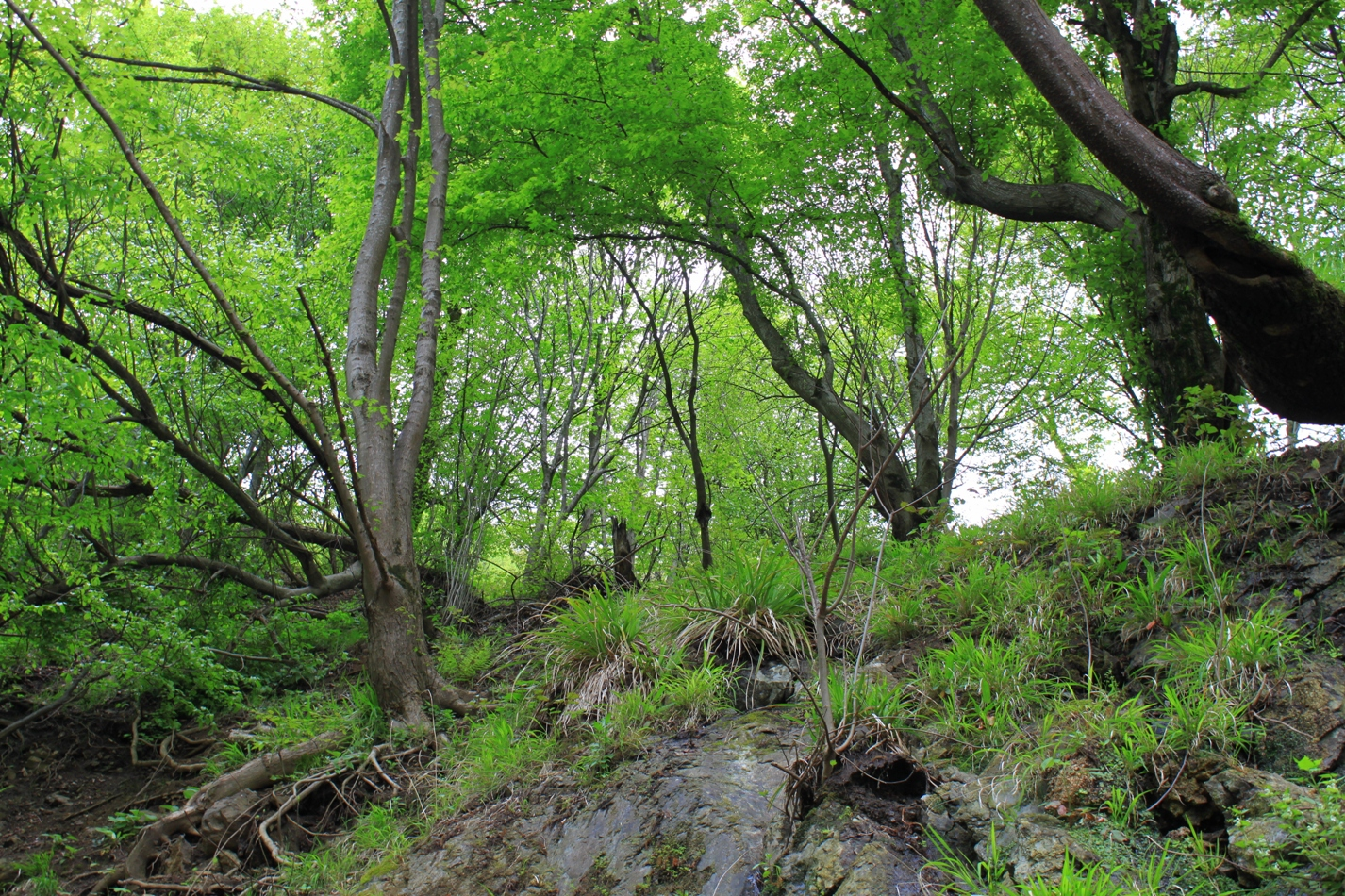

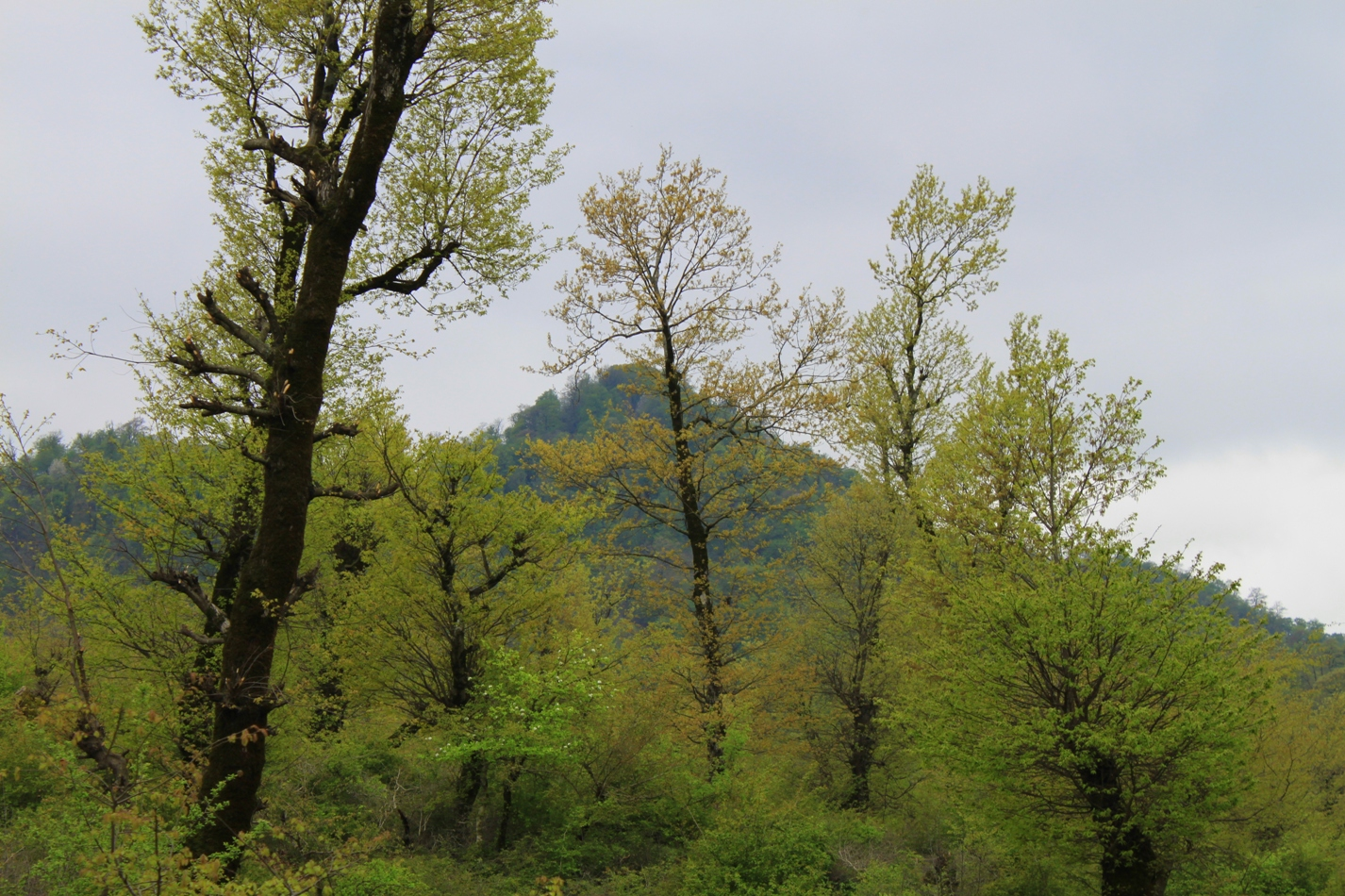

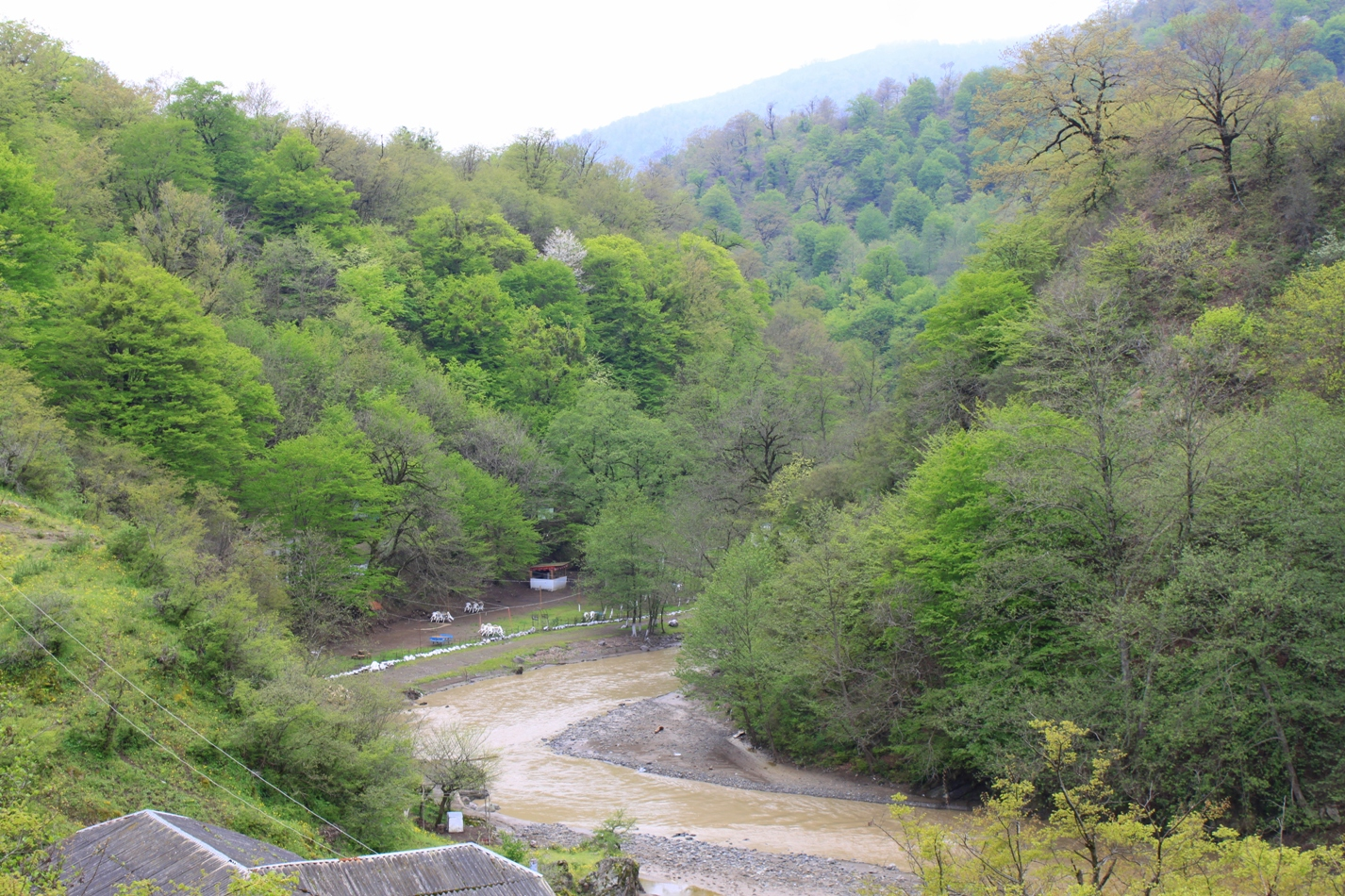

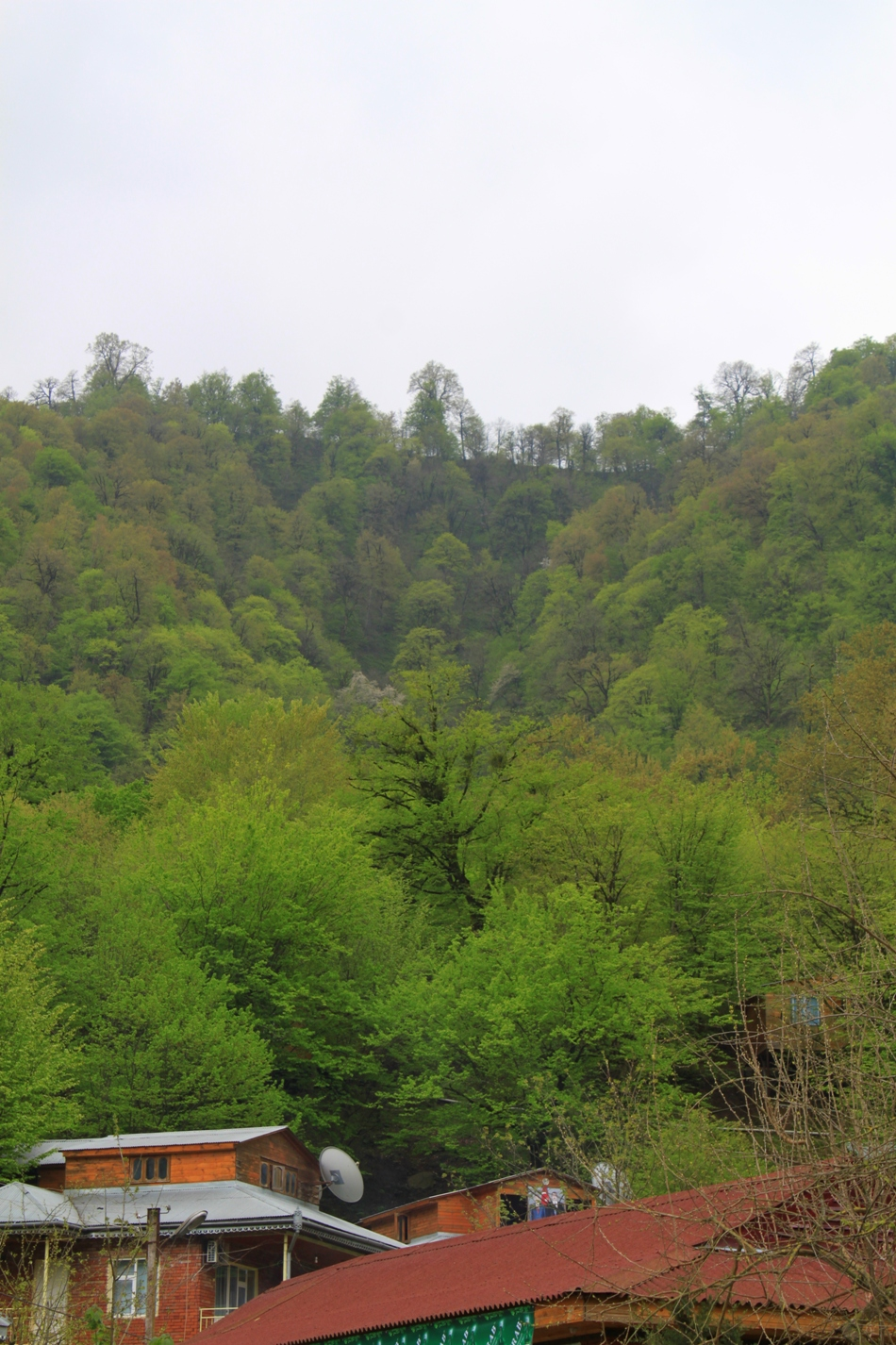
