= Jalilabad District (Azerbaijan) =

District in southeastern Azerbaijan

- District
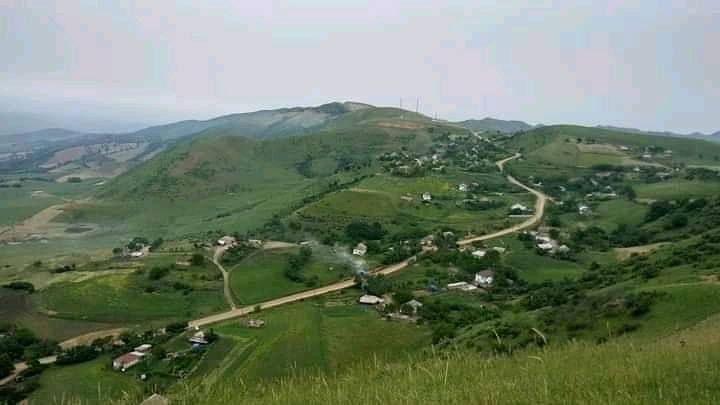
- Jalilabad District, Zehmetabad Village

- Map of Azerbaijan showing Jalilabad District
- Coordinates: 39°12′N 48°18′E
- Country: Azerbaijan
- Region: Lankaran-Astara
- Established: 8 August 1930
- Capital: Jalilabad
- Settlements: 120

Government
  - Governor: Rafig Jalilov

Area
  - Total: 1,440 km^{2} (560 sq mi)

Population (2020)
  - Total: 225,300
  - Density: 156/km^{2} (405/sq mi)
- Time zone: UTC+4 (AZT)
- Postal code: 1500
- Website: celilabad-ih.gov.az

Jalilabad District (Azerbaijani: Cəlilabad rayonu) is one of the 66 districts of Azerbaijan. It is located in the southeast of the country and belongs to the Lankaran-Astara Economic Region. The district borders the districts of Masally, Yardimli, Bilasuvar, and Neftchala. There are two cities in the district, Jalilabad and Göytəpə. Jalilabad is its capital and largest city. As of 2020, the district had a population of 225,300.

== Geography ==
=== Territory ===
The territory of the district primarily consists of plains and low mountains. The elevation of the eastern part is below sea level. The climate is mild with dry summers. The average temperature is 1–3 °C (34–37 °F) in winter and 25–30 °C (77–86 °F) in summer. The average amount of annual precipitation is 400–600mm. The Bolgarchay, Misharchay, Goytapachay, and other rivers flow through the region. The soils here are alluvial-meadow, chestnut, mountainous brown, forest soils and others. Forests occupy 17,700 hectares (177 km^{2}). Mammals such as rabbit, wild boar, badger, wolf, fox, jackal, and beaver inhabit the region along with birds such as eagle, crow, lark, duck, coot, pheasant, stork, bustard.

Natural resources include oil-and-gas fields, lime, clay, sand and stone deposits. Total area of productive lands is 661.2 km^{2}, area of useless agricultural lands is 8.16 km^{2}.

== History ==
=== Pre-history ===
Alikomektepe is the oldest recorded settlement in territories of Jalilabad. The settlement is located near Üçtəpə village. It has been inhabited since c. 5000 BCE.

=== Before Arab invasions ===
The town of Hamashara, which was located in the Jalilabad region, belongs to the 2nd millennium BC. The city was surrounded by a 3-meter-high (9.8 ft) fort.

=== Medieval period ===
After the Arabs invaded the territory, the city of Hamashara collapsed and in subsequent periods the city of Hasilly was established.

=== Modern era ===
As a result of the relocation of Russians to Azerbaijan in the 1930s, the city of Astarkhanbazar, where Azerbaijanis and Russians lived together, became the center of the region.

The district was established on August 8, 1930. Until July 2, 1967, it was called Astarkhanbazar. Its name changed on June 2, 1967, to Jalilabad in honor of the Azerbaijani writer-playwright Jalil Mammadguluzadeh. On May 26, 1964, Jalilabad joined the Bilasuvar administrative-territorial unit. On January 6, 1965, it again became an independent region.

In 1999, more than 190 municipalities were established in the district; 841 people took part in the election of the municipalities.

There are 50 historical and archaeological monuments, such as the remains of the ancient cities Bajirevan and Mughan, Alikomektepe and Misharchay residential areas, the Kazan lodge, the Bajiravan mounds, Gurudere residential area from the 4th millennium B.C., Jinlitepe which is from the Bronze Age, and Pirakhanjar, Zoroastrian cabins in the district.

== Economy ==
The main spheres of the regional economy are cotton growing, potato growing and animal breeding. About 276 square kilometres (107 sq mi) of area is used for cattle-breeding pastures. Planted lands in the region cover 536 square kilometres (207 sq mi). Grains, potatoes, and viticulture in the economy of the Jalilabad region are the main ones. In addition, vegetables, sunflower and corn are grown in the territory. The total area of fruit gardens in the region is 1.83 square kilometres (0.71 sq mi).

In 2017, the volume of gross domestic product increased by 4.8 times compared to 2003 and by 62.6% compared to 2016. 7,244,000 manat industrial output was produced in the region, which is 11.4 times more than in 2003.

In the same year, 282,376,000 manat worth of agricultural products were produced, of which 139,864,000 manats or 49.5% from crops and 142,512,000 512 manats or 50.5% from livestock.

In addition, 23 thousand tons of meat, 82.4 thousand tons of milk and 41.3 million eggs were produced. 222 thousand cattle and 624572 birds are fed in private farms. Also, 3635 tons of poultry meat was sold by "Jalilabad-broiler" OJSC in 2017.

There are about 250 states, 800+ private and five foreign enterprises operating in the region. The largest ones are center of forest preserve and restoration, "Avtodəmir" JSC, Irrigation Department, Melioservice, Regional experiment station, "Kənd-Nəqliyyat" JSC, "Kərpic zavodu" JSC, "Kristal" Ltd, "Dalğa-94", "Nuranə" medical center, "Xalçaçılıq Mərkəzi", "Rizvan" and "Duyaz" companies.

There are five city and three rural health clinics in the region, with 176 doctors and 528 midwives in 40 outpatient clinics.

=== Tourism ===
The territory of the Jalilabad region is appropriate for hunting. The law allows hunting of aquatic birds on designated hunting farms. There is also a small local history museum, park, hotel and motel. "Kral" recreation zone is functioning in Jalilabad city.

== Media, education and culture ==
Jalilabad region has its own TV and radio stations, and newspapers such as "Yeni gun", "Sozun ishigi" and "Munasibet". "Yeni gun" has been published since 1932. The "Sozun ishigi" and "Munasibet" newspapers began their operation between 2003 and 2004

There are 18 infant schools, 129 general education schools, two vocational and secondary schools, and a higher school in the district. In 2010 Ilham Aliyev took part in the opening ceremony of a chess school in Jalilabad city.

There are two music schools, 43 clubs, 64 libraries, an art gallery, and parks in the district, a centralized library with 601,893 books, regional history and ethnography museum with 2,123 exhibits, a regional state art gallery with 137 exhibits, and 50 historical and cultural monuments in the region.

== Demographics ==
According to the State Statistics Committee, as of 2018, the population of the city was 219,500, which increased by 47,500 persons (about 27 percent) from 172,000 persons in 2000. Of the total population, 110,700 are men and 108,800 are women. More than 28.7 percent of the population (about 63,200 persons) consists of young people and teenagers aged 14–29. There are 219,286 Azerbaijanis, 130 Russians, 15 Turkish people, 14 Tatars, 12 Ukrainians, 21 Talysh people and 22 other nationals.

The population of city (at the beginning of the year)
Region	2000	2001	2002	2003	2004	2005	2006	2007	2008	2009	2010	2011	2012	2013	2014	2015	2016	2017	2018	2019	2020	2021
Jalilabad region	172,0	174,1	176,0	177,9	179,8	182,3	184,8	187,0	189,4	191,7	194,1	196,5	198,8	202,0	205,6	209,3	213,0	216,6	219,5	222,4	225,3	227,6
urban population	48,2	49,0	49,7	50,5	51,4	52,4	53,4	54,1	54,9	55,8	56,3	56,9	57,3	57,9	58,6	59,5	60,2	60,9	61,4	62,0	62,6	62,9
rural population	123,8	125,1	126,3	127,4	128,4	129,9	131,4	132,9	134,5	135,9	137,8	139,6	141,5	144,1	147,0	149,8	152,8	155,7	158,1	160,4	162,7	164,7

== Notable natives ==
- Mustafa Nuriyev – general-major
- Javad Gasimov - Head of the Staff of the National Defense of Azerbaijan
- Gabil Guliyev - National artists of Azerbaijan
- Nuraddin Mehdikhanli - National artists of Azerbaijan
- Teymur Mustafayev - Honoured artist of Azerbaijan
- Mansure Musayeva - Hero of the Socialist Labour
- Gulkhara Mehdiyeva - Hero of the Socialist Labour
- Musret Mammadov - Hero of the Socialist Labour
- Mharram Aliyev - Hero of the Socialist Labour
- Boukkhan Mammadov - Hero of the Socialist Labour
- Sahib Ahadov - European Champion 2019 and silver medalist of World Championship 2018

== Gallery ==
Jalilabad District

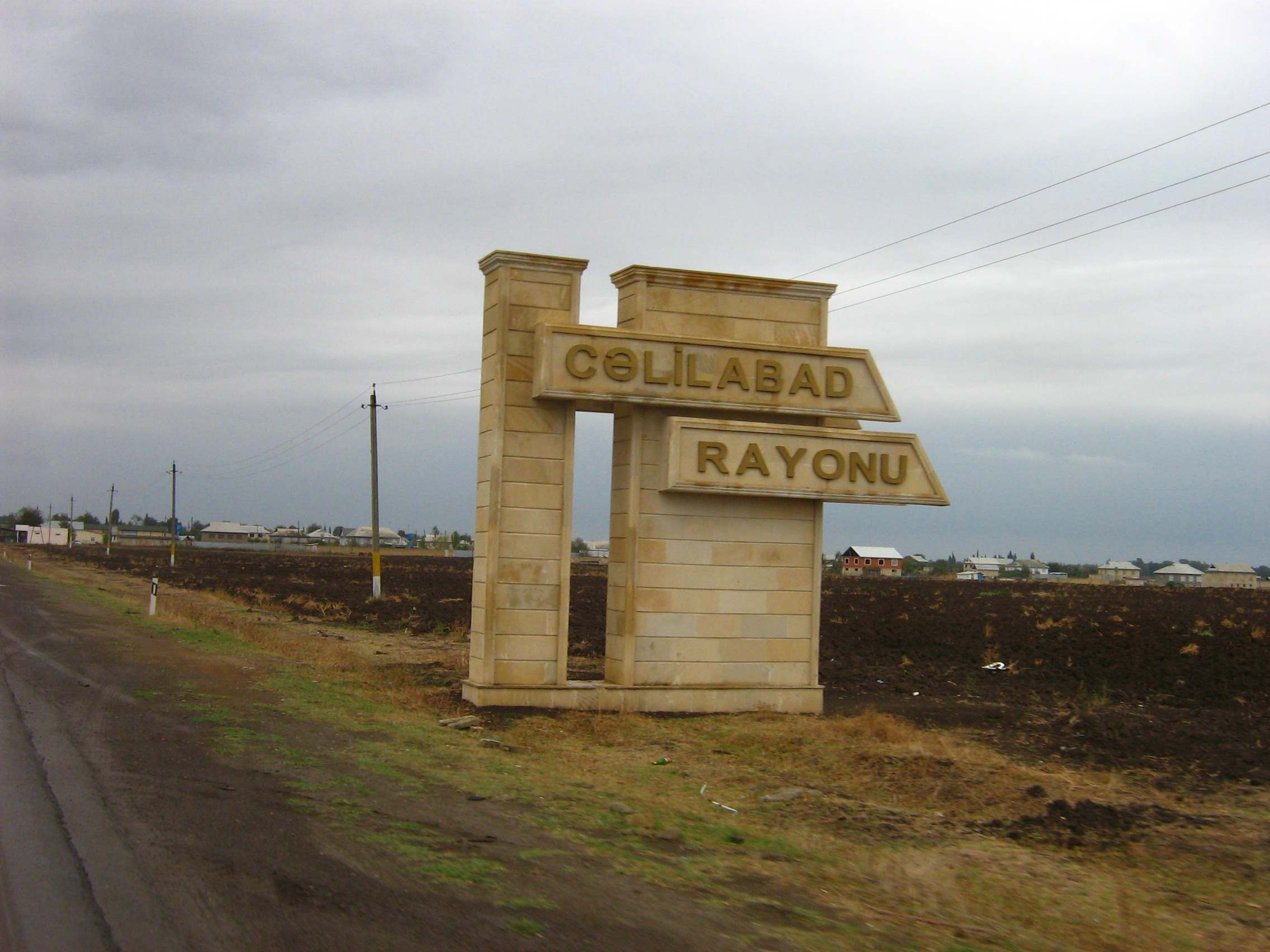
Road sign at the entrance of Jalilabad District

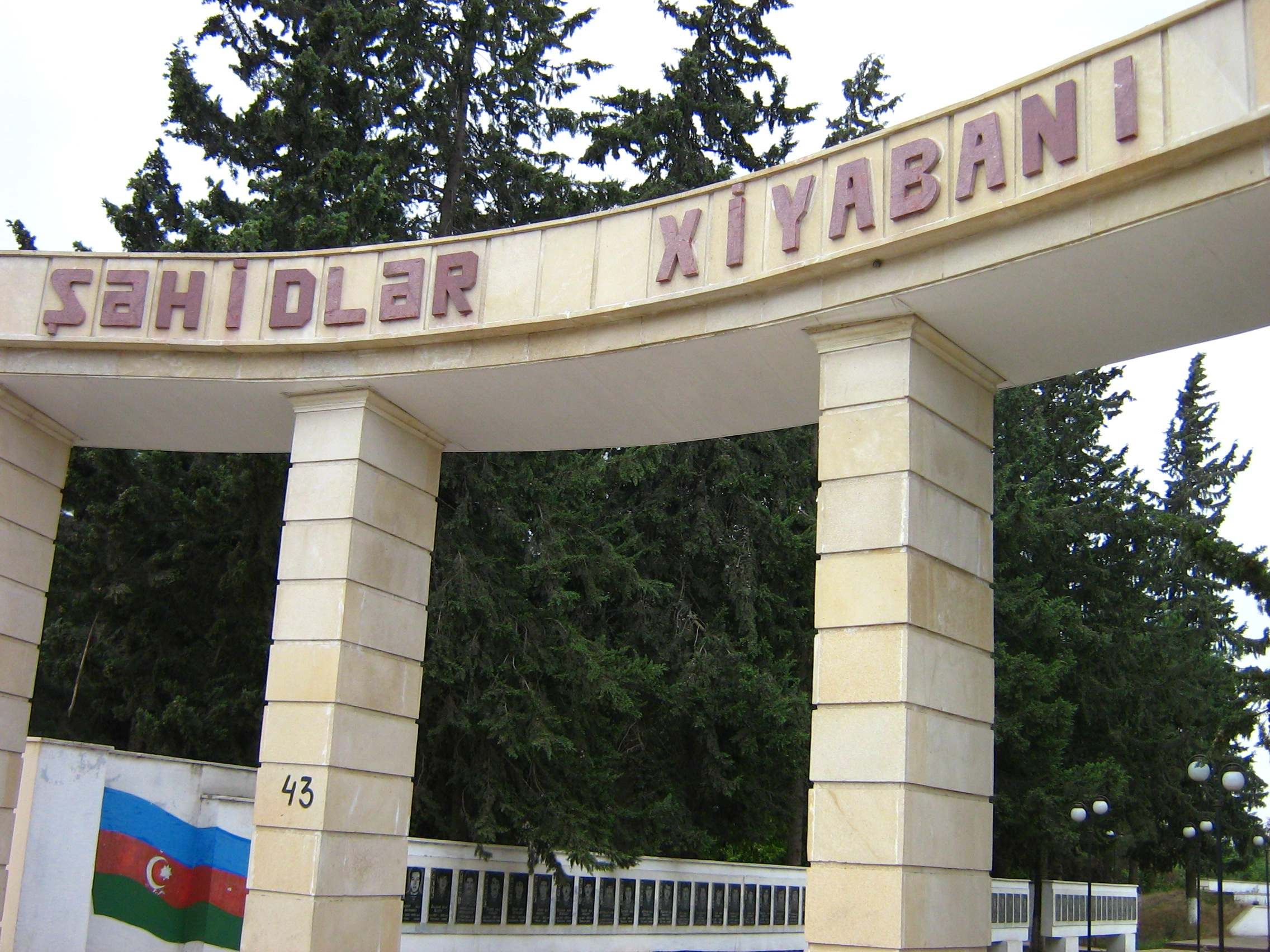
Martyrs' Lane in Jalilabad District

"Aztelekom" Limited Liability Company in the District
