= Askar Khan of Shirvan =

18th-century ruler of Shirvan Khanate

Askar Khan

Khan of Shirvan
- Reign: April 1789 – October 1789
- Predecessor: Fath-Ali Khan of Quba
- Successor: Qasim Khan
- Born: 1756; Shirvan Khanate
- Died: 1820 (aged 63–64); Shamakhi, Shirvan Khanate
- Burial: Yeddi Gumbaz Mausoleum
- Tribe: Khanchobany
- Dynasty: House of Sarkar
- Father: Muhammad Said Khan
- Mother: Firangiz khanum
- Religion: Sunni Islam

Askar Khan was a claimant to Khanate of Shirvan and brief ruler in 18th-century.

== Background ==
He was born to Muhammad Said Khan of Shirvan and his first wife Firangiz khanum in 1756. His family belonged to House of Sarkar (Persian: آلِ سَرکار, romanized: Āl-e Sarkār) of Khanchobani tribe (Azerbaijani: Xançobanı, lit. 'Khan's shepherd'). He had older full-brothers Muhammad Riza Khan and Mahmud bey, in addition to half-brothers Isgandar bey and Qasim Khan. His full-sister Hamsa Khanum (1764 –1815) married to a local Shirvani bey while half-sisters, Halima Khanum (1765–1793) and Anakhanum Khanum (1774 – ?) married to their paternal cousins.

His father became ruler of Shirvan in 1763 together with his uncle Aghasi Khan. Following his father's execution in 1788 in Salyan, 32-year-old Askar fled together with his brother Qasim to Muhammad Hasan of Shaki, who gave them protection. According to Russian-Armenian major Averian Serebrov who was dispatched to the region in 1796, Fath-Ali Khan of Quba, deeming it necessary to have escaped heirs nearby to prevent any future obstacles to his rule, demanded the two Muhammad Hasan. When he refused, Fath Ali Khan marched on him with his army, seized Shaki, and captured Muhammad Hasan. However, the two already escaped and joined their cousins with Ibrahim Khalil Khan in Shusha.

According to Isgandar bey Hajinsky, however, this was a hearsay spread especially by Askar's loyalists:

Meanwhile, Shabaddin Sultan of Arash, acting on the orders of his overlord, Muhammad Hasan Khan, under various pretexts, requested the presence of the sons of Muhammad Said Khan – Askar Bey and Qasim Bey – and the son of Aghasi Khan, Mustafa Bey (later known as Mustafa Khan of Shirvan), who had previously fled to Shusha.

He arrested them and, along with Fath Ali Khan's emissary, Muhammad Karim Bey, and a trusted representative of the Khan of Nukha, Haji Said Bey, sent them under escort to Shamakhi.

When the prisoners, accompanied by a joint escort, reached the river Goychay, one of Al-i Sarkar's loyalists spread a rumour that Fath Ali Khan had arrested the Nukha nobles and was preparing to enter the Shaki province with a large army.

Haji Said Bey, believing the rumour, immediately returned to Nukha and released the arrested sons of the Shirvan khans. They promptly departed for Avaria to seek the protection of Umma Khan, offering their support in avenging the blood of his grandfather, Nutsal Khan, who had been killed in Fath Ali Khan's tent in 1774.

== In exile ==
According to Serebrov, Ibrahim Khalil Khan and Umma Khan then compelled Fathali's new vassal Muhammad Hasan Khan to join them, despite his marriage alliance. These three rulers united their forces, numbering up to 18,000, and besieged New Shamakhi. The siege lasted 45 days (Hajinsky offers 10 months). However, later the Shamkhal of Tarki came to Fatali Khan's rescue and forced Umma Khan to retreat. According to Heraclius II's letter to Grigory Potemkin on 20 January 1788, Umma Khan not having achieved another pan-Dagestani coalition against Fath Ali Khan (they refused to be fight citing religious reasons), managed to forge an alliance against Georgia. As a token of reconciliation, Fath Ali Khan betrothed his daughter Peri Jahan Khanum to Umma Khan with a dowry of 200,000 roubles, half of which was immediately paid in khan's coin. Muhammad Hasan Khan justified his participation in the war by claiming he had been forced into it and reaffirmed his previous peace with Fath Ali Khan. Left without allies, Ibrahim Khan withdrew with Askar, Qasim, Mustafa and Ismail to Karabakh. According to Hajinsky, Shirvanese heirs agreed that Karabakh was no longer safe for them and opted for fleeing further to Ottoman Empire.

After reconciling with the other khans, Fath Ali Khan crossed the Kura river and ravaged Karabakh, then aimed to seize Ganja and the fortress of Shusha in alliance with Heraclius II. However, illness halted the campaign and went to Baku for treatment, where he died on 2 April 1789.

== Reign ==
According to Serebrov, upon hearing of Fath Ali Khan's death, Muhammad Hasan Khan seized the opportunity to install Manaf Zarnavai, son of Hajji Muhammad Ali, whom he recognized as rightful heir, in Shamakhi. He raised troops, marched on Shamakhi, forced Ahmad Khan to leave, installed Manaf as khan, and returned. Manaf ruled only 15 days. Soon Askar Khan arrived with armies of Karabakh and captured Manaf, and executed him to secure their claim. However, Bakikhanov offers another version of this event. According to him, Manaf was dispatched alongside Shirvani princes. Khan of Shaki installed Manaf in New Shamakhi, while Askar Khan was installed as a khan among nomads (Persian: ایلات, romanized: īlāt). Manaf's rule lasted a week after Shaki armies left the region. Askar Khan became Khan while Mustafa went to his father's former base Alvand.

According to Serebrov, Ahmad Khan made repeated attempts to retake Shamakhi, however, he reconciled with him through the mediation of Haji Ahmet, the ruler of Dzhengutay. Bakikhanov gives more background on this event – according to him, Muhammad Hasan Khan had taken offence over the killing of his appointee Manaf Khan. He sent an envoy to Quba Khanate and forged an alliance to attack against Shirvan. Both armies besieged New Shamakhi eventually, but the siege dragged on for quite some time, and the heat grew intense. Askar Khan, in secret, sent 5,000 tomans in cash and goods to the Dagestanis (presumably, the Dzhengutay) within Muhammad Hasan Khan's army. As a result, discord broke out within the allied forces.

== Fall from power ==
His fall from power was reported differently by sources. Serebrov describes how Askar deposed by his younger brother Qasim during the absence of their cousins. According to Serebrov, Qasim seized control with the backing of local beys and neighbouring rulers, placing Askar under respectful surveillance. The account then moves on to the broader military conflict between Qasim and Mustafa, culminating in Mustafa's successful surprise assault on Shamakha and restoration of control, again keeping Askar under nominal watch. In contrast, Bakikhanov offers a briefer, more judgmental portrayal, framing Askar's downfall primarily as a result of his personal shortcomings. He notes that only 6 months into Askar Khan's rule, the Shirvan nobility became disillusioned with his passivity and shifted their support to his brother Qasim. After being imprisoned, Askar escaped to Shaki. Bakikhanov doesn't mention Askar after this.

According to Adolf Berzhe, Askar Khan died in 1820 and was buried in Yeddi Gumbaz Mausoleum in Shamakhi.

== Family ==
He was married to Nisa Khanum, daughter of certain Haji Merdi in 1800. They had five children:

1. Agha bey (1802–1864) m. Nisa Khanum, daughter of certain Mammad in 1848; had issues
2. Ali Hasan bey (1810–1862) m. 1839 to Sultan Nisa Khanum, widower of his brother; had issue
3. Muhammad Hasan bey (1805–1832) m. 1827 to Sultan Nisa Khanum, granddaughter of Muhammad Husain (brother of Muhammad Said and Aghasi Khans); had issue
4. Muhammad Ali bey (1814–?) m. 1858 to Kafiya Sultan (granddaughter of Qasim Khan), had podpolkovnik rank in Imperial Russian Army
5. Ismat Khanum (1815–?) m. Teymuraz bey, son of Mustafa Khan

== Sources ==
- Bakikhanov, Abbasgulu agha; Floor, Willem M.; Ǧawādī, Ḥasan; Bāqīẖānli, ʿAbbās-Quli Aġā (2009). The heavenly rose-garden: a history of Shirvan & Daghestan. Washington, DC: Mage Publ. ISBN 978-1-933823-27-0.
- Berzhe, Adolf (1873). Кавказ и Закавказье за время управления генерал-лейтенанта маркиза Филиппа Осиповича Паулуччи и генерала от инфантерии Николая Федоровича Ртищева, 1811–1816 [The Caucasus and Transcaucasia during the administration of Lieutenant General Marquis Philip Osipovich Paulucci and General of Infantry Nikolai Fedorovich Rtishchev, 1811–1816]. Акты, собранные Кавказской археографической комиссией [Acts collected by the Caucasian Archaeographic Commission] (in Russian). Vol. 5. Caucasus Viceroyalty.
- Bournoutian, George A. (2021). From the Kur to the Aras: a military history of Russia's move into the South Caucasus and the first Russo-Iranian war, 1801–1813. Iran studies. Leiden: Brill. ISBN 978-90-04-44515-4.
