= Qasim Khan of Shirvan =

18th-century ruler of Shirvan Khanate

Qasim Khan
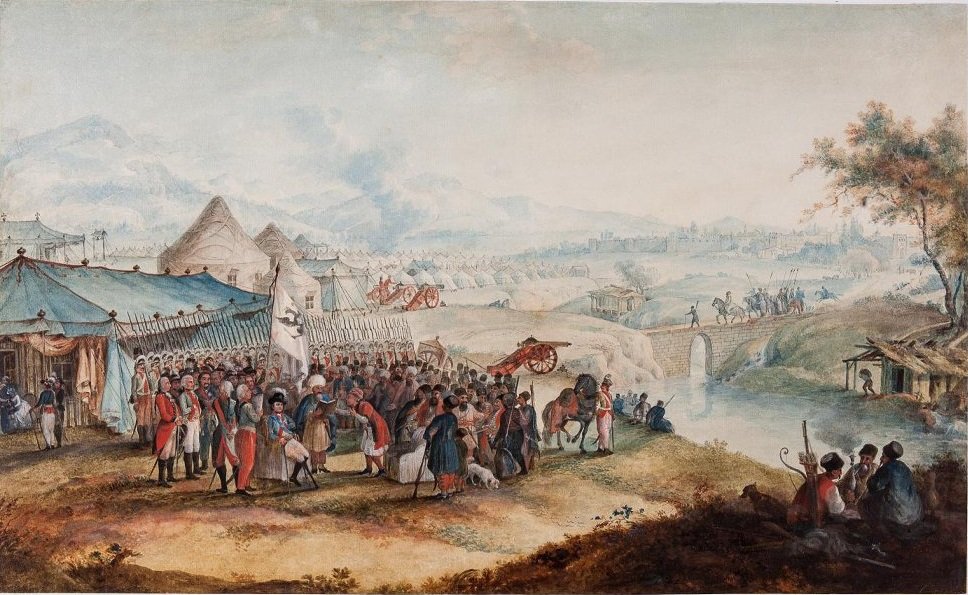
- Oath of allegiance of Qasim Khan, new Khan of Shamakhi to Russia among the corps under the command of Count V. A. Zubov off the Aksuchay River in 1796 by Gavriil Sergeev. A late 1790s painting.

Khan of Shirvan
- 1st reign: October 1789–1792
- Predecessor: Askar Khan
- Successor: Mustafa Khan
- 2nd reign: 13 November 1796 – December 1796
- Predecessor: Mustafa Khan
- Successor: Mustafa Khan
- Born: 1763; Shamakhi, Shirvan Khanate
- Died: 1828 (aged 64–65); Behrud, Nakhchivan Khanate
- Spouse: Kafiya Khanum
Regnal name
- Muhammad Qasim Khan
- Tribe: Khanchobany
- Dynasty: House of Sarkar
- Father: Muhammad Said Khan
- Mother: Mah Pari khanum
- Religion: Sunni Islam
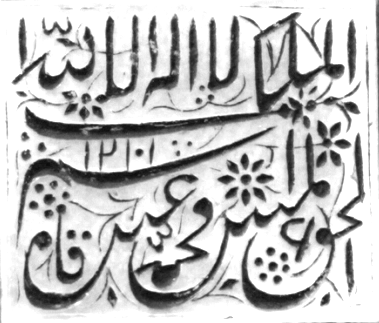
- Seal

Qasim Khan (Persian: قاسم خان, romanized: Qāsem Khān) was the khan of Shirvan who reigned twice in late 18th century.

== Background ==
He was born to Muhammad Said Khan of Shirvan and his second wife Mah Pari Khanum in 1763. His family belonged to House of Sarkar (Persian: آلِ سَرکار, romanized: Āl-e Sarkār) of the Turkic Khanchobani tribe (Azerbaijani: Xançobanı, lit. 'Khan's shepherd'). He had elder half-brothers Muhammad Riza Khan, Askar Khan and Mahmud bey, in addition to full-brother Isgandar bey. His half-sister Hamsa Khanum (1764 –1815) married to a local Shirvani bey while full-sisters, Halima Khanum (1765–1793) and Anakhanum Khanum (1774 – ?) married to their paternal cousins.

He was the only son of his father who was born during his reign. Following his father's execution in 1788 in Salyan, 25-year-old Qasim fled together with his brother Askar to Muhammad Hasan of Shaki, who gave them protection. According to Russian-Armenian major Averian Serebrov who was dispatched to the region in 1796, Fath-Ali Khan of Quba, deeming it necessary to have escaped heirs nearby to prevent any future obstacles to his rule, demanded the two Muhammad Hasan. When he refused, Fath Ali Khan marched on him with his army, seized Shaki, and captured Muhammad Hasan. However, the two already escaped and joined their cousins with Ibrahim Khalil Khan in Shusha.

According to Isgandar bey Hajinsky, this account was merely hearsay propagated by Askar's supporters. He explains that Shabaddin Sultan of Arash, following orders from his overlord Muhammad Hasan Khan, used various pretexts to summon the sons of former khans who had previously taken refuge in Shusha. After arresting them, he sent the prisoners under escort to Shamakhi, accompanied by Fath Ali Khan's emissary Muhammad Karim Bey and Haji Said Bey, a trusted representative of the Khan of Shaki. However, when the convoy reached the Goychay river, one of Sarkar loyalists spread a false rumor that Fath Ali Khan had arrested Nukha nobles and was advancing on Shaki province with a large army. Believing this fabrication, Haji Said Bey immediately returned to Nukha and freed the imprisoned Shirvan khans' sons, who then fled to Avaria to seek protection from Umma Khan, offering their assistance in avenging his father Nutsal Khan's death in Fath Ali Khan's tent in 1774.

== First exile ==
According to Serebrov, Ibrahim Khalil Khan and Umma Khan then compelled Fathali's new vassal Muhammad Hasan Khan to join them, despite his marriage alliance. These three rulers united their forces, numbering up to 18,000, and besieged New Shamakhi. The siege lasted 45 days (Hajinsky offers 10 months). However, later the Shamkhal of Tarki came to Fatali Khan's rescue and forced Umma Khan to retreat. According to Heraclius II's letter to Grigory Potemkin on 20 January 1788, Umma Khan not having achieved another pan-Dagestani coalition against Fath Ali Khan (they refused to be fight citing religious reasons), managed to forge an alliance against Georgia. As a token of reconciliation, Fath Ali Khan betrothed his daughter Peri Jahan Khanum to Umma Khan with a dowry of 200,000 roubles, half of which was immediately paid in khan’s coin. Muhammad Hasan Khan justified his participation in the war by claiming he had been forced into it and reaffirmed his previous peace with Fath Ali Khan. Left without allies, Ibrahim Khan withdrew with Askar, Qasim, Mustafa and Ismail to Karabakh. According to Hajinsky, Shirvanese heirs agreed that Karabakh was no longer safe for them and opted for fleeing further to Ottoman Empire.

After reconciling with the other khans, Fath Ali Khan crossed the Kura river and ravaged Karabakh, then aimed to seize Ganja and the fortress of Shusha in alliance with Heraclius II. However, illness halted the campaign and went to Baku for treatment, where he died on 2 April 1789. According to Serebrov, upon hearing of Fath Ali Khan's death, Muhammad Hasan Khan seized the opportunity to install Manaf Zarnavai, son of Hajji Muhammad Ali, whom he recognized as rightful heir, in Shamakhi. He raised troops, marched on Shamakhi, forced Ahmad Khan to leave, installed Manaf as khan, and returned. Manaf ruled only 15 days. Soon Askar Khan arrived with armies of Karabakh and captured Manaf, and executed him to secure their claim. However, Bakikhanov offers another version of this event. According to him, Manaf was dispatched alongside Shirvani princes. Khan of Shaki installed Manaf in New Shamakhi, while Askar Khan was installed as a khan among nomads (Persian: ایلات, romanized: īlāt). Manaf's rule lasted a week after Shaki armies left the region. Askar Khan became Khan while Mustafa went to his father's former base Alvand.

However Askar's reign last only 6 months. Serebrov describes how Askar deposed by his younger brother Qasim during the absence of their cousins. According to Serebrov, Qasim seized control with the backing of local beys and neighbouring rulers, placing Askar under respectful surveillance. In contrast, Bakikhanov offers a briefer, more judgmental portrayal, framing Askar's downfall primarily as a result of his personal shortcomings. He notes that only 6 months into Askar Khan's rule, the Shirvan nobility became disillusioned with his passivity and shifted their support to his brother Qasim. After being imprisoned, Askar escaped to Shaki. Bakikhanov doesn't mention Askar after this.

== First reign and second exile ==
According to Bakikhanov, Qasim Khan's first act as khan was to attack his cousin Mustafa in Alvand. However, he was defeated and returned to Shamakhi. Bakikhanov explains his loss of prestige with these words: "He paid too much attention to trivial matters. In his rulings, he made no distinction between the lower classes and the elite. Because of this, the people of Shirvan were offended by him, and he, in turn, regarded the people of Shirvan as hostile." Qasim Khan sent gifts and provisions to bring Shahbaz Bey, son of Tishsiz Muhammad, along with a group of Dagestanis, and hired them as advisers. Preferring outsiders over locals drew ire from Shirvani beys. After 2 years of reign, in 1792, naib of Sadarin mahal, `Omar Soltan and naib of Howz mahal, Yuzbashi bey (Qasim's own son-in-law) invited Mustafa Khan to dethrone Qasim. Unable to stand, Qasim escaped to Quba through Qabala. Serebrov gives more detailed account of the event. According to him, upon learning of Qasim's actions, Mustafa Khan and his brother were displeased and began plotting his removal. First, they persuaded some local rulers to their side and gathered troops. Mustafa left his younger brother Ismail there with a contingent for defence. Mustafa then marched on the new fortress of Shamakhi, where Qasim Khan resided.

At night, approaching in secrecy, Mustafa's forces stormed the city gates unexpectedly. Qasim Khan, caught off guard, fled over the city walls into the Shaki with a few loyal followers, leaving behind Mustafa not only his deposed brother Askar but also his own wife – Mustafa's sister. Mustafa thus secured the khanate while Ismail continued governing Alvand under full submission to his elder brother. Mustafa later allowed his sister to rejoin her husband Qasim, and she departed with all her belongings.

Qasim khan spent two years in exile, trying to gain support from Shaykh Ali Khan of Quba and Muhammad Hasan Khan of Shaki. Both leaders soon invaded Shirvan in April 1795 according to Butkov. Shaykh Ali Khan assembled 12,000 capable fighters from Derbent and Quba, 3,000 hired Dagestanis, and 800 labourers from Derbent armed with iron spades. He stationed his troops on one side of the city, while the Khan of Shaki positioned his on the other, cutting off the defenders' access to water. According to Bakikhanov, siege lasted several months until a day of heavy rain and flood destroyed tents of allies. Butkov gives more detailed account, saying that Muhammad Hasan Khan arrived at Sheikh Ali Khan's camp, remained there overnight due to heavy rain. The besieged, aware of this and suffering from thirst, dispatched 100 cavalry and 100 infantry armed with melee weapons. During the downpour, they launched a surprise night attack on the sleeping Shaki troops, killing several hundred, capturing 400, and scattering the rest. Bakikhanov reports that the attack was led by `Omar Soltan. Meanwhile according to Serebrov, Shaykh Ali attacked Alvand, and captured Ismail, had his eyes gouged out along with two beys and a sultan of Rudbar. Peace was concluded in May 1795 between the allied forces and Mustafa Khan after a 25-day siege. Mustafa Khan agreed to pay Sheikh Ali Khan the same tribute that Fath Ali Khan had previously received from Shirvan – namely, 10,000 roubles annually.

== Second reign ==
After failure of campaign Qasim Khan retreated to Caucasus mountains, setting his camp on Qaraburqa mountain (near Qalacıq). According to Butkov, he gained support of new Khan of Shaki, Salim Khan in the meantime who proposed Russian general Valerian Zubov to plunder Mustafa Khan's domains in August 1796. Soon, Qasim Khan's plans were realized when Mustafa Khan retreated to Mughan plain. Upon Mustafa's flight, Persian expedition's leader Zubov summoned Qasim and, on 13 November [O.S. 2 November] 1796, proclaimed him ruler of the Shirvan Khanate and handed over Shamakhi to him. The proclamation took place with formal ceremony. A large formation of Russian troops stood at arms under a raised banner. In the presence of Zubov, Qasim Khan listened to a declaration read aloud before assembled Shamakhi elders and commoners. The document detailed the disloyal actions of Mustafa Khan and announced Qasim Khan's appointment in his place.

After the reading, Qasim Khan was led to swear an oath of loyal vassalage to the Russian Empire on the Qur’an. He then placed the document into the outer fold of his turban, making it visible to all. Zubov addressed him with further remarks, expressing the wish for mutual friendship. Qasim then mounted a horse gifted by Zubov, along with other items, and proceeded to Shamakhi accompanied by his entourage and a cheering crowd. Throughout the procession and until he entered the city, cannon salutes were fired.

However, this second reign lasted merely days as on 18 December [O.S. 7 December] 1796, newly enthroned Paul of Russia recalled Russian troops from South Caucasus. According to Bakikhanov, this new situation forced Qasim Khan to switch his allegiance to Agha Muhammad Khan Qajar, submitting to his general Ali-Qoli Khan Qajar who arrived in Shirvan. However when Mustafa Khan emerged and submitted at the same time, Qasim fled to Shaki, leaving his throne to Mustafa.

== Third exile ==
Qasim Khan fled to Qajar Iran subsequently, but kept in touch with powerful people in Caucasus. According to a Russian report dated December 1802, while in Iran, he was married to a daughter of Mirza Rabi, vizier of Heraclius II and was corresponding with Prince David of Georgia. Tsitsianov proposed using the restoration of Qasim Khan to the Shirvan in January 1803 as a tactical manoeuvre to distract Shaykh Ali Khan. In his 8 January 1803 report, Tsitsianov informed that Shaikh Ali Khan, under the guise of seeking Russian support, aims to depose Mustafa Khan of Shirvan and install Qasim Khan, Mustafa's cousin, in his place. The plan includes securing the strategic Salyan province—once part of Quba Khanate—for Russia, with Qasim promising its cession as gratitude. Once Qasim is installed, Russian troops could occupy Salyan and later Derbent with minimal resistance. The report also mentioned that Qasim Khan himself wrote directly to Alexander I of Russia in support of this plan.

He informed Shaikh Ali that, allegedly with imperial approval, he was ready to support Qasim Khan's reinstatement, fulfilling a prior mutual agreement. A secret order was also given to General Irinarch Zavalishin to reinforce this narrative. Tsitsianov admitted this could be a diversion but left open the possibility of actually restoring Qasim Khan if it proved strategically beneficial. He regarded Qasim as a useful political instrument, not a priority, unless circumstances aligned in Russia's favour.

In this detailed report from 31 March 1803, Tsitsianov informed Alexander I of Russia that Shaikh Ali Khan was attempting to depose Shirvan's Mustafa Khan and replace him with Qasim Khan, Mustafa's cousin. Tsitsianov highlighted that Sheikh Ali has already begun destabilising the Shirvan province and was protecting Qasim Khan, who had taken refuge with him. The report framed this manoeuvre as part of a broader regional struggle in which local rulers seek Russian support to defend against rivals. Tsitsianov used the situation to justify a decisive Russian move to annex Baku Khanate, viewing it as essential to forestalling Shaikh Ali's ambitions, including installing Qasim Khan, and securing Russian interests in the Caspian region. Alexander I in his reply, however warned that occupying Derbent and not supporting Shaikh Ali Khan's plan to install Qasim Khan in Shirvan might expose Russian intentions prematurely and damage trust with other regional rulers. He instructed Tsitsianov to consider this risk carefully and possibly use Sultan Ahmed Khan of Avar, not Shaikh Ali, to enthrone Qasim Khan if deemed necessary.

In his letter of 28 April 1803, Tsitsianov informed Shaikh Ali Khan that Alexander I had granted permission to support the installation of Qasim Khan as the new khan of Shirvan. Tsitsianov confirmed his readiness to act accordingly, in line with their mutual agreement, and requested Shaikh Ali Khan's opinion on the best measures to execute the plan. He also emphasised the need to keep the operation strictly confidential until it was set in motion. Tsitsianov kept entertaining the idea for a few years. In letter dated 16 January 1805, Tsitsianov warned Salim Khan that Mustafa Khan's alliances, particularly with Shaikh Ali Khan of Derbent, are dangerous. He explicitly stated that Shaikh Ali's apparent friendship with Mustafa conceals ambitions to deceive him and transfer control of Shirvan to Qasim Khan. However, Tsistianov's plans foiled once Shaikh Ali Khan switched his allegiance to Fath Ali Shah.

Qasim Khan soon appeared again in the court of Surkhay II. The latter attacked Jafar Qoli Khan Donboli in 1808, who was the new khan of Shaki installed by Russians 2 years ago. Camping near Jalayir village, he brought 12,000 Gazikumukh soldiers, 1,500 Dzhengutai Kumyks under Ali Sultan, 1,000 soldiers from Akusha-Dargo Union, 3,000 Avars, 2,000 soldiers from Jar-Balakan and 500 Kaitags. His army included the blind Muhammad Hasan, as well as Qasim Khan of Shirvan and Surkhay's sons Nuh, Khalid, Zakariyya and Murtuzali. However, he was defeated after 2 hours of battle. However, Surkhay expelled Qasim Khan later who on 22 June 1811 the Samur River into the Quba region with his family, entourage of about 100 people and livestock, without prior notice. This was seen as a threat from new Russian authorities. Major-general Semyon Guryev who was appointed to the region interpreted this as a deliberate attempt by Surkhay Khan to influence the Quba population, potentially implying that Qasim Khan intended to assume power in Quba.

Citing rumours of infectious disease in Surkhay Khan's territory, Guryev dispatched a Quba noble and interpreter to tell Qasim Khan that, without higher authorisation, he could not be accepted in Quba, especially given the health risk. Qasim Khan refused to return, claiming he was unable to go back to Gazikumukh, while the carts that had brought him were already sent back across the river on Surkhay Khan's orders. In response, Guryev deployed an officer with 25 cossacks to block Qasim Khan's group from entering Quba villages and to insist on his return across the Samur River. Commandant of Baku, Ivan Repin supported Guryev's measures and ordered strict border controls to prevent the spread of disease and stated that any decision on Qasim Khan's case should await viceroy Alexander Tormasov’s directive.

== Return to Caucasus ==
Qasim Khan was later received by major-general Andrey Pestel who was newly appointed chief of Tiflis 15th Grenadier Regiment in 1812. Pestel befriended him, and held secret talks that revived Qasim's hopes of regaining the khanate of Shirvan. By 1813, he was already accepted to Russian service. However, he was denied entry to Shirvan by Mustafa Khan, who still feared his ambitions. To alleviate such fears, Aleksey Velyaminov directed Pestel to cease all communication with Qasim in 1818.

He was residing in the lands of Talysh Khanate when Mustafa Khan escaped to Qajar Iran in 1820 following annexation of Shaki Khanate. Following this, viceroy Aleksey Yermolov sent special directives to Valerian Madatov that are under no circumstances Qasim was to be allowed entry into Shirvan. Should Qasim present any claims, those were to be rejected outright. As far as Yermolov was concerned, Qasim had no right to khanate. As a solution to this problem, Yermolov requested from Alexander I in 1822 that Qasim Khan be granted, for the duration of his life, an annual pension of 1,000 silver roubles drawn from the revenues of Shirvan, together with the administration—though not the ownership—of several villages in the Quba district, to be designated at the discretion of the authorities. This request was granted, along with 300 households under his rule.

== Last years ==
It appears following the outbreak of Russo-Persian War of 1826–1828, Qasim Khan once again chose to ally with Qajar Iran as Ivan Paskevich reported to Karl Nesselrode in 1829 that "son of the traitor Qasim Khan stirred rebellion in the Erivan region". Qasim Khan died a year before the rebellion, in 1828 and was buried in Behrud, which was under Qajar rule at the time.

== Family ==
Adolf Berzhe reported that he was only married once to his cousin Kafiya Khanum (1766–1849), Aghasi Khan's daughter in 1793. However, a Russian report dated December 1802 stated that he was married to a daughter of Mirza Rabi, vizier of Heraclius II during his first exile. His sons with Kafiya Khanum were:

- Isgandar bey (1795–1846) – m. 1834 to Gowhar Khanum (d.1863), daughter of Ismail bey of Shamakhi.
- Allahverdi bey (1796–1818) – m. 1814 to Nisa Begüm (d.1834), daughter Haji Bey – yuzbashi of Basqal. Allahverdi bey later escaped to Ottoman Turkey and died in Erzurum.
- Muhammad Said Khan (1797–1827) – m. 1815 to Fatma Khanum (d. 1826), daughter of Hasan Effendi of Quba. Muhammad Said also fled to Ottoman Turkey and died there.

Apart from that, according to Bakikhanov she had a daughter who was married to naib of Howz mahal, Yuzbashi bey, who eventually deposed him. However, this issue was not reported by genealogists.

== Seal ==
Qasim Khan's seal from the second reign has been found in 2019 by researcher Fariz Khalilli, which was in possession of Qasim Khan's sixth-generation descendant. The base of the seal is made of bronze, while the seal itself is made of mother-of-pearl. It measures 29 millimetres in width and 33 millimetres in length. The inscription on the seal reads: "There is no god but Allah, the Sovereign, the Manifest Truth. His servant Muhammad Qasim" (Arabic: لَا إِلٰهَ إِلَّا اللهُ ٱلْمَلِكُ ٱلْحَقُّ ٱلْمُبِينُ. عَبْدُهُ مُحَمَّدٌ قَاسِم, romanized: Lā ilāha illā Allāh al-Malik al-Ḥaqq al-Mubīn. ʿAbduhu Muḥammad Qāsim). The seal is dated to 1210 AH (1795/1796 CE).

== Sources ==
- Bakikhanov, Abbasgulu agha; Floor, Willem M.; Ǧawādī, Ḥasan; Bāqīẖānli, ʿAbbās-Quli Aġā (2009). The heavenly rose-garden: a history of Shirvan & Daghestan. Washington, DC: Mage Publ. ISBN 978-1-933823-27-0.
- Berzhe, Adolf (1866). Гуджары и другие акты на грузинском, арабском, персидском и турецком языках, 1398-1799; Кавказ и Закавказье во второй половине XVIII столетия и за время управления генерал-лейтенанта Карла Федоровича Кнорринга 2-го, 1762–1802 [Qajars and other acts in Georgian, Arabic, Persian and Turkic, 1398–1799; Caucasus and Transcaucasia in the second half of the 18th century and during the reign of Lieutenant General Karl Fedorovich Knorring the 2nd, 1762–1802]. Акты, собранные Кавказской археографической комиссией [Acts collected by the Caucasian Archaeographic Commission] (in Russian). Vol. 1. Caucasus Viceroyalty.
- Berzhe, Adolf (1868). Кавказ и Закавказье за время управления генерала от инфантерии, князя Павла Дмитриевича Цицианова, 1802–1806 [The Caucasus and Transcaucasia during the administration of General of Infantry, Prince Pavel Dmitrievich Tsitsianov, 1802–1806]. Акты, собранные Кавказской археографической комиссией [Acts collected by the Caucasian Archaeographic Commission] (in Russian). Vol. 2. Caucasus Viceroyalty.
- Berzhe, Adolf (1870). Кавказ и Закавказье за время управления генерала от кавалерии Александра Петровича Тормасова, 1809–1811 [The Caucasus and Transcaucasia during the administration of Cavalry General Alexander Petrovich Tormasov, 1809–1811]. Акты, собранные Кавказской археографической комиссией [Acts collected by the Caucasian Archaeographic Commission] (in Russian). Vol. 4. Caucasus Viceroyalty.
- Berzhe, Adolf (1873). Кавказ и Закавказье за время управления генерал-лейтенанта маркиза Филиппа Осиповича Паулуччи и генерала от инфантерии Николая Федоровича Ртищева, 1811–1816 [The Caucasus and Transcaucasia during the administration of Lieutenant General Marquis Philip Osipovich Paulucci and General of Infantry Nikolai Fedorovich Rtishchev, 1811–1816]. Акты, собранные Кавказской археографической комиссией [Acts collected by the Caucasian Archaeographic Commission] (in Russian). Vol. 5. Caucasus Viceroyalty.
- Berzhe, Adolf (1874). Кавказ и Закавказье за время управления генерала от инфантерии Алексея Петровича Ермолова, 1816–1827 [The Caucasus and Transcaucasia during the administration of Infantry General Alexei Petrovich Ermolov, 1816–1827]. Акты, собранные Кавказской археографической комиссией [Acts collected by the Caucasian Archaeographic Commission] (in Russian). Vol. 6–1. Caucasus Viceroyalty.
- Bournoutian, George A. (2021). From the Kur to the Aras: a military history of Russia's move into the South Caucasus and the first Russo-Iranian war, 1801–1813. Iran studies. Leiden: Brill. ISBN 978-90-04-44515-4.
- Butkov, Pyotr (1869). Материалы для новой истории Кавказа, с 1722 по 1803 год [Materials for a new history of the Caucasus, from 1722 to 1803] (in Russian). Vol. 2. Saint Petersburg.
