= Aghasi Khan =

18th-century ruler of Shirvan

Khan of Shirvan
- Reign: 1763–1768
- Predecessor: Hajji Muhammad Ali Khan
- Successor: Fath-Ali Khan of Quba
- Alongside: Muhammad Said Khan

Khan of Shirvan
- Reign: 1774–1782
- Predecessor: Fath-Ali Khan of Quba
- Successor: Fath-Ali Khan of Quba
- Alongside: Muhammad Said Khan
- Born: 1731; Shirvan, Safavid Empire
- Died: 1788 (aged 56–57); Baku, Baku Khanate
- Wives: Bibi Khanum khanum; Khadija Khanum; Khadija Khanum khanum; Abida Khanum
- Tribe: Khanchobany
- Dynasty: House of Sarkar
- Father: Allahverdi bey
- Mother: Ummugulsum khanum
- Religion: Sunni Islam

Aghasi Khan (Persian: اقاسى خان, 1731–1788) was second Khan of Shirvan Khanate along with his brother Muhammad Said Khan.

== Background ==
He was born to powerful noble Allahverdi bey (d. 1767) (although, Bakikhanov erroneously names his father as Askar bey) and his wife Ummugulsum khanum (d. 1742) in 1731. His parents were of House of Sarkar (Persian: آلِ سَرکار, romanized: Āl-e Sarkār) of Khanchobani tribe (Azerbaijani: Xançobanı, lit. 'Khan's shepherd'). He had an elder brother Muhammad Said, and younger brothers Muhammad Husain (1733-1789) and Agha Razi (1735-1758). His sisters Fatima (b.1737), Qiz Ana Khanum (b. 1747) and Sakina (1755-1796) were all married to local Shirvani beys.

== Dual reign with Muhammad Said ==
Shirvan was a region on the periphery of Afsharid Iran. In 1761, with Karim Khan Zand’s approval, the residents of New Shamakhi deposed Nader Shah’s appointed governor and installed their own choice, Hajji Mohammad ʿAli Khan, who ruled until early 1763. In the eastern part however, nomadic Khanchobani tribe was in power. According to Samuel Gottlieb Gmelin, Aghasi's father Allahverdi bey was powerful noble whose lands stretched from Ağsu river to Altıağac and from villages around Old Shamakhi to Nəvahı in east. He was soon succeeded by his sons Muhammad Said Khan and Aghasi.

Just seven days after Fatali Khan's enthroning in 1758, Agha Razi, the younger brother of Aghasi, raided Quba’s Barmak district (modern Xızı, Azerbaijan) and abducted 200 families. In retaliation, Fatali Khan launched a campaign against Shirvan, captured around 400 families, resettled them on his own lands, and killed Agharazi in battle near Old Shamakhi. According to Gmelin, Fath Ali soon started the plan on conquest of Shirvan, but Shirvan's alliance with Shaki Khanate's Muhammad Husayn Khan Mushtaq, which hindered him from acting.

Accounts of Hajji Mohammad ʿAli Khan’s removal from power vary. According to Gmelin, in 1761, Muhammad Said defeated Hajji Mohammad ʿAli, established sole authority, returned to Old Shamakhi, and appointed a deputy to govern New Shamakhi. Researcher Hazi Abdullayev attributes Hajji Mohammad ʿAli’s fall to the actions of Azad Khan, a commander of the defeated Fath-Ali Khan of Urmia, who had lost in a struggle against Karim Khan Zand. After his defeat, Azad Khan fled to Georgia and from there came to Shamakhi, where he was warmly received by Hajji Mohammad ʿAli Khan. However, Azad Khan, after taking refuge in Shamakhi, soon began insulting and mistreating the local population. Despite public dissatisfaction, Hajji Mohammad ʿAli ignored these actions, which ultimately led to his overthrow. Hajji Mohammad ʿAli Khan was arrested and sent under special guard to Old Shamakhi, where he died a year later at the age of 80. After taking New Shamakhi, Muhammad Said Khan returned to Old Shamakhi and appointed a deputy to govern the new city. Bournoutian on the other hand, citing Bakikhanov, Fath-Ali Khan of Quba gained influence there, and "appointed his own governors, such as Aghasi Beg and Askar Beg, both members of the same family."

In 1765, Fath-Ali Khan demanded 10,000 roubles worth tribute from Shirvan. The underlying reason was that Southern Dagestani feudal lords had requested Fatali Khan’s permission to cross Quba en route to Shamakhi. Fatali Khan claimed that he refused and instead demanded the aforementioned sum from the Shamakhi Khanate to fund a military force against the Dagestanis. Although initially agreed to the proposal, later, a plague had broken out in Shamakhi, claiming 15–20 lives per day. Muhammad Said Khan, having somewhat consolidated his authority, responded that due to the widespread disease, it would be impossible to collect and pay the requested tax from the population. The refusal sharply worsened relations between the two khanates and gave a pretext to Fatali Khan to invade. This time, he also managed allegiance of Shaki Khanate.

A Russian consular report from Baku, dated 11 April 1765, states that the Shamakhi khan was “forced through negotiations to yield to the Shaki khan, and agreed to pay tribute to both him and the Quba khan; an agreement was concluded, though not yet ratified by the ruler of Quba.” But brothers later refused to honour this agreement. According to another consular report to the Collegium of Foreign Affairs dated 17 October 1765, Shirvan khans “would not, under any circumstances, agree to pay Fatali Khan of Quba any sum from the revenues of Shamakhi.” On 30 December 1765, combined forces advanced on Shamakhi—700 from Shaki and 7,000 from Quba. Soon the impregnable fortress of Mücü was also captured. Stunned by this turn of events, Muhammad Said of Shamakhi submitted.

Brothers sent two of their leading beys to Quba to initiate talks and present their terms. In response, the Quba authorities also dispatched a two-man delegation to the Shirvanese to begin peace discussions. The negotiations resulted in a mutual agreement. However, even this bilateral arrangement was eventually broken, and the threat of renewed conflict re-emerged. The Quba Khanate now began serious preparations for a new campaign. In addition to regular armed nökers and retainers, the army included militias and troops from Derbent, Quba, Baku, and Salyan, along with hired Tabasaran and Akushin mercenaries.

In early May 1768, Quba’s forces advanced on Shamakhi. Simultaneously, allied forces from the Shaki Khanate also moved in. Eyewitnesses described the mobilisation as so swift and forceful that the Shamakhi side had no time to organise a proper defence. Khans surrendered without a fight in June 1768. Both khans were detained by the khan of Shaki on request of Fatali. Muhammad Said Khan was arrested but later released, whereas Aghasi Khan was dealt with in characteristically brutal fashion. This was reportedly due to the perception that the ageing Muhammad Said (who was 60), viewed as passive and militarily ineffective, posed little threat. In contrast, the younger and more energetic Aghasi, considered an implacable enemy of Quba and a serious political threat, was seen by the Quba authorities as needing permanent neutralisation. Captain Adil Cherkessky, who visited Shamakhi at the time, reported to the Kizlyar commandant on 20 September 1768 that Agasi Khan “was an extremely strong man and highly skilled in military affairs.” He was held in custody in Derbent “precisely because, due to his exceptional military competence and unmatched personal bravery, Aghasi Khan could not fail to pose a threat to Fatali Khan.”

Aghasi khan was blinded by Muhammad Husayn, while his brother was imprisoned by Fath Ali. The khanate was divided between Shaki and Quba Khanates who appointed their own governors. The western part was governed by Hajji Muhammad's son, Manaf Zarnavai; while Fath Ali Khan installed his brother Abdulla bey as governor in east.

== Exile ==
Even though he was blinded, Aghasi managed to escape to Karabakh in 1769. With a small band of loyal followers, he entrenched himself in the Mughan steppe, near the Kura, at the settlement of Yelovlu (that is, according to Butkov, Bakikhanov names this location as Kutvan which is far from Mughan, Naila Bayramova placed it near modern Alvand), awaiting an opportunity to reclaim his lost rule. In 1770, he forged an alliance with Heraclius II, Muhammad Husayn Khan of Shaki and Ibrahim Khalil Khan of Karabakh against Quba. Muhammad Husayn Khan of Shaki — by then estranged from Fatali Khan due to minor land gains in Shirvan — and Mursel Khan of Avaria, who harboured enmity against Fatali, also joined the alliance. By 1771, Avars led by Mursel Khan's brother Muhammad Mirza and nephew Bulach arrived in Shaki. Heraclius contributed by sending Turkic contingent from Borchaly. A decisive battle was fought by 6 February 1722. Avar princes were killed, Huseyn Khan retreated to Shaki, and Agasi Khan fled to his power base.

Towards the end of 1722, Mursel Khan re-established contact with his former allies. The allied forces advanced on Shamakhi and temporarily captured it. However, a quarrel between Huseyn Khan and Aghasi Khan led to Huseyn’s withdrawal with his troops. Fatali Khan, having rapidly mobilised an army of up to 20,000 men including the detachment of Malik Muhammad Khan of Baku and Akushites. This army won a decisive victory. Aghasi Khan again fled to Kutvan, and Mersel Khan was killed by Akushites. Shamakhi remained under Fatali Khan’s control, marking a further consolidation of his power and influence in the region.

This situation came to an end when new Avar leader Umma Khan tried to forge an anti-Quba alliance with other Dagestani and Caucasian feudal lords with marrying his sister Bakhtika to Ibrahim Khalil Khan of Karabakh. The Dagestani coalition of rulers was being led by Amir Hamza, his son-in-law Muhammad of Gazikumukh, his nephew Ghāzī Rustam of Tabasaran, Ali-Sultan of Dzengutai and Tishsiz Muhammad (Muhammad the Toothless) – head of Kazanishche Kumyks; they were also joined by the Kumyks of Endirey, Kostek and others. Result was a disastrous defeat in the battle of Gavdushan, near the city of Khudat in July 1774.

== Second dual reign ==
Following the battle, in order to maintain legitimacy in Shirvan, released Muhammad Said Khan to rule the khanate in New Shamakhi as a vassal. Poruchik Pavel Batyrev, who visited the region at the time, reported that Muhammad Said “had no authority of his own and obeys Fatali Khan in all matters.” Aghasi Khan also returned to rule Shirvan Khanate in 1774 from his base in Alvand. Aghasi seemingly also accepted vassalage to Fatali Khan.

Ottoman sultan Abdulhamid I approached Caucasian khans in an effort to forge an alliance against Heraclius II and Russians. Both Muhammad Said Khan and Aghasi Khan, addressing the Ottoman governor of Çıldır, expressed readiness to join a mutual military operation in 1775/1776.

However, seeking to exploit the situation through dynastic politics, Fatali Khan agreed to a marriage alliance—his sister Fatma Khanum was promised to Muhammad Said’s son, Muhammad Rza in 1779. This move was designed to neutralise Muhammad Said as a political threat and to sow discord between the brothers - a decision that enraged Agasi Khan, who then left his refuge in Alvand and demanded sole authority from his elder brother.

Muhammad Riza on the other hand, fled to court of Fatali Khan, who soon launched punitive invasion onto Shirvan. Though the two brothers united against him, they were defeated—Muhammad Said fled to Sheki, and Aghasi returned to Alvand. Despite several attempts at reconciliation, including sending gifts to Fatali Khan, their political position continued to weaken. Multiple sources confirm that Fatali Khan subsequently appointed Muhammad Rza as vassal khan of Shirvan. According to Adolf Berzhe, he ruled for 3 years.

== Death ==
Aghasi Khan was eventually killed in 1788/89. According to Butkov, his death was ordered by Ibrahim Khalil Khan of Karabakh in retaliation for the killing of his brother, Mehrali Bey. Mehrali had been murdered by Aghasi’s followers in an earlier episode tied to inter-khanate rivalries. Ahmad bey Javanshir, however, gives a more detailed background: following internal conflict over the governorship of Karabakh, Mehrali had fled to Quba after being displaced by his brother Ibrahim Khan. Fatali Khan of Quba had previously dispossessed Aghasi Khan and his son from their power base, prompting Aghasi and his son to kill Mehrali Bey, likely as part of a political reprisal. An alternative version from Mirza Hasan Alkadari states that Fatali Khan, angered by the brothers’ support for the Avar ruler Umma Khan, had both Aghasi and Muhammad Said arrested and executed in Baku. According to another account, Fatali Khan had already removed his son-in-law Muhammad Riza from Shamakhi and had him executed in Quba in 1788.

Ottoman Sultan later sent decorated garments, gold-inlaid quiver, 1,000 gold coins to Aghasi Khan and sable fur robe, brocade cloak, decorated cap to Muhammad Said Khan in December 1785.

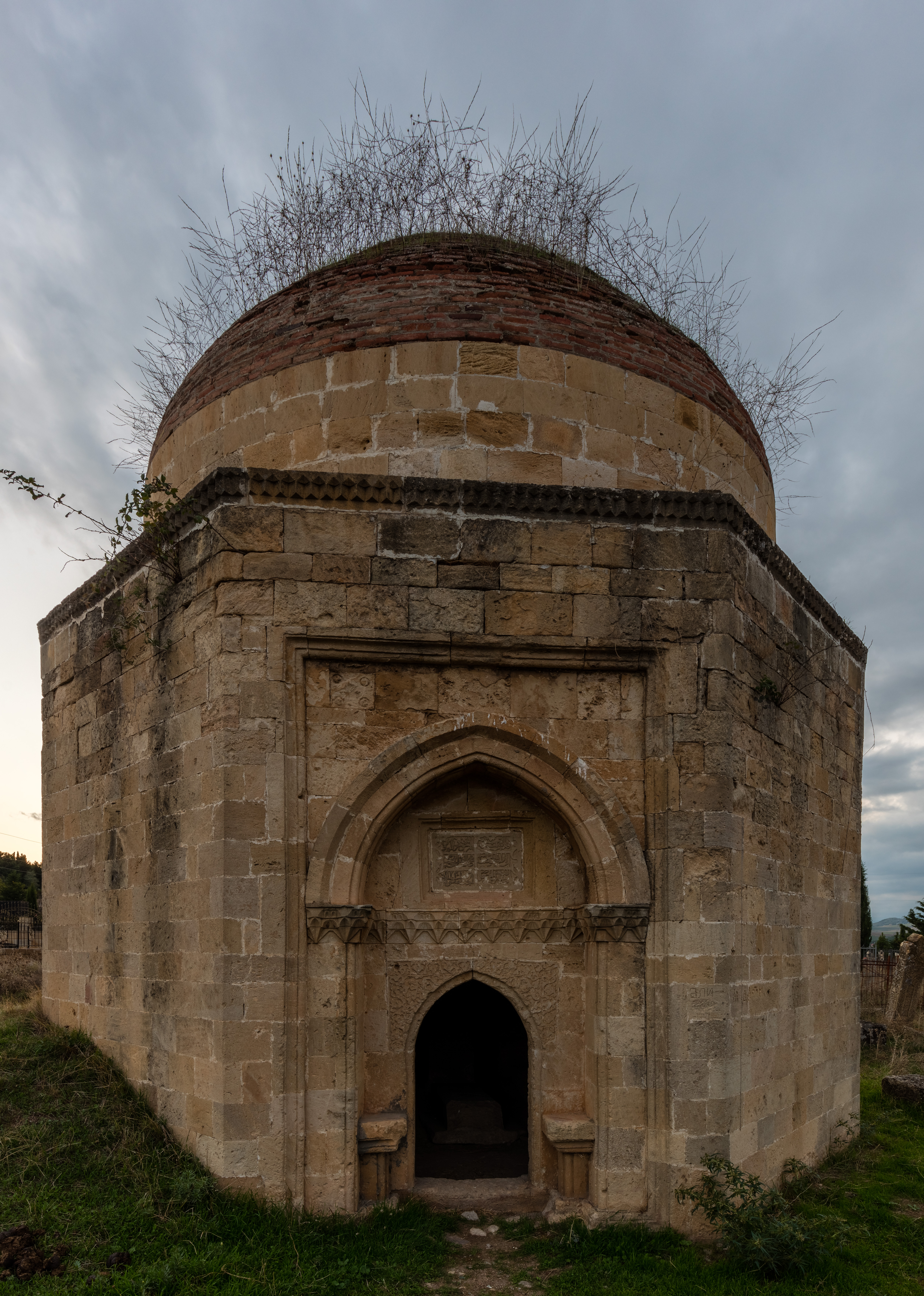
Tomb of Bibikhanum Khanum, Yeddi Gumbaz Mausoleum

== Family ==
According to Adolf Berzhe, Aghasi khan were married to 4 wives and had 12 children:

- Bibikhanum Khanum (m. 1756, d. 1807), daughter of Sultan Ali bey of Hovz:
1. Mostafa Khan – Last khan of Shirvan
2. Ismail bey Sarkar (1760 – 1848) – blinded by Fatali Khan, owner of Mərzili, he was buried in the Baba Samid.
3. Kafiye khanum (b. 1766) – married his cousin Qasim Khan of Shirvan.
4. Balash khanum (b. 1769) – married Agha Razi bey, son of Murtuza Ali bey
5. Khadija khanum (1776–1852) – married Qasim bey, son of Baghir bey
- Haji Khanum (m. 1760, d. 1774), daughter of Muhammad Ali khan:
1. Khayrunnisa khanum (b. 1761) – married to Shafi bey, son of Haji Qadir bey
- Hajikhanum Khanum – (m. 1771, d. 1783, buried in Baba Samid), daughter of Malik Muhammad of Alvand
1. Hashim Khan (1773–1845) – founded the village of Haşımxanlı.
2. Jafar bey (1776–1827)
3. Abdulla bey (1778–1842)
4. Mehdi bey (1780–1827)
5. Hajar khanum (b. 1783) – married to Mir-Hasan Khan of Talysh Khanate
- Abida khanum (m. 1776 – d.1805), daughter of Imamverdi bey:
1. Seadet khanum (b. 1778) – married to Agha Kishi bey (d. 1849), son of Sultan bey of Sulut

== Sources ==
- Abdullayev, Hazi (1965). Азербайджан в XVIII веке и взаимоотношения его с Россией [Azerbaijan in the 18th century and its relations with Russia] (in Russian). Изд-во Академии наук Азербайджанской ССР.
- Bakikhanov, Abbasgulu agha; Floor, Willem M.; Ǧawādī, Ḥasan; Bāqīẖānli, ʿAbbās-Quli Aġā (2009). The heavenly rose-garden: a history of Shirvan & Daghestan. Washington, DC: Mage Publ. ISBN 978-1-933823-27-0.
- Bayramova, Naila (2009). Şamaxı xanlığı [Shamakhi Khanate] (PDF) (in Azerbaijani). Baku: Təhsil.
- Berzhe, Adolf (1873). Кавказ и Закавказье за время управления генерал-лейтенанта маркиза Филиппа Осиповича Паулуччи и генерала от инфантерии Николая Федоровича Ртищева, 1811-1816 [The Caucasus and Transcaucasia during the administration of Lieutenant General Marquis Philip Osipovich Paulucci and General of Infantry Nikolai Fedorovich Rtishchev, 1811-1816]. Акты, собранные Кавказской археографической комиссией [Acts collected by the Caucasian Archaeographic Commission] (in Russian). Vol. 5. Caucasus Viceroyalty.
- Bournoutian, George A. (2021). From the Kur to the Aras: a military history of Russia's move into the South Caucasus and the first Russo-Iranian war, 1801-1813. Iran studies. Leiden: Brill. ISBN 978-90-04-44515-4.
- Butkov, Pyotr (1869). Материалы для новой истории Кавказа, с 1722 по 1803 год [Materials for a new history of the Caucasus, from 1722 to 1803] (in Russian). Saint Petersburg.
