= Muhammad Said Khan (Shirvan) =

18th-century Shirvan ruler

Khan of Shirvan
- Reign: 1763–1768
- Predecessor: Hajji Muhammad Ali Khan
- Successor: Fath-Ali Khan of Quba
- Alongside: Aghasi Khan

Khan of Shirvan
- Reign: 1774–1782
- Predecessor: Fath-Ali Khan of Quba
- Successor: Muhammad Riza Khan
- Born: 1729; Shirvan, Safavid Empire
- Died: 1788 (aged 58–59); Salyan, Quba Khanate
- Issue: Muhammad Riza Khan; Askar Khan; Qasim Khan
- Tribe: Khanchobany
- Dynasty: House of Sarkar
- Father: Allahverdi bey
- Mother: Ummugulsum khanum
- Religion: Sunni Islam

Muhammad Said Khan (Persian: محمد سعید خان, 1729–1788) was a Khan of Shirvan Khanate along with his brother Aghasi Khan.

== Background ==
He was born to powerful noble Allahverdi bey (d. 1767) (although, Bakikhanov erraneously names his father as Askar bey) and his wife Ummugulsum khanum (d. 1742) in 1729. His parents were of House of Sarkar (Persian: آلِ سَرکار, romanized: Āl-e Sarkār) of Khanchobani tribe (Azerbaijani: Xançobanı, lit. 'Khan's shepherd'). He had younger brothers Aghasi Khan, Muhammad Husain (1733-1789) and Agha Razi (1735-1758). His sisters Fatima (b.1737), Qiz Ana Khanum (b. 1747) and Sakina (1755-1796) were all married to local Shirvani beys.

== Dual reign with Aghasi Khan ==
In 1761, with Karim Khan Zand’s approval, the residents of New Shamakhi deposed Nader Shah’s appointed governor and installed their own choice, Hajji Mohammad ʿAli Khan, who ruled until early 1763. In the eastern part however, nomadic Khanchobani tribe was in power. According to Samuel Gottlieb Gmelin, Muhammad Said's father Allahverdi bey was powerful noble whose lands stretched from Ağsu river to Altıağac and from villages around Old Shamakhi to Nəvahı in east, and Göyçay in the west. He was succeeded by his sons Muhammad Said Khan and Aghasi Khan upon his death.

Just seven days after Fatali Khan's enthroning in 1758, Agha Razi, the younger brother of Muhammad Said, raided Quba’s Barmak district (modern Xızı, Azerbaijan) and abducted 200 families. In retaliation, Fatali Khan launched a campaign against Shirvan, captured around 400 families, resettled them on his own lands, and killed Agharazi in battle near Old Shamakhi. According to Gmelin, Fath Ali soon started the plan on conquest of Shirvan, but Shirvan's alliance with Shaki Khanate's Muhammad Husayn Khan Mushtaq, which hindered him from acting.

Accounts of Hajji Mohammad ʿAli Khan’s removal from power vary. According to Gmelin, in 1761, Muhammad Said defeated Hajji Mohammad ʿAli, established sole authority, returned to Old Shamakhi, and appointed a deputy to govern New Shamakhi. Researcher Hazi Abdullayev attributes Hajji Mohammad ʿAli’s fall to the actions of Azad Khan, a commander of the defeated Fath-Ali Khan of Urmia, who had lost in a struggle against Karim Khan Zand. After his defeat, Azad Khan fled to Georgia and from there came to Shamakhi, where he was warmly received by Hajji Mohammad ʿAli Khan. However, Azad Khan, after taking refuge in Shamakhi, soon began insulting and mistreating the local population. Despite public dissatisfaction, Hajji Mohammad ʿAli ignored these actions, which ultimately led to his overthrow. Hajji Mohammad ʿAli Khan was arrested and sent under special guard to Old Shamakhi, where he died a year later at the age of 80. After taking New Shamakhi, Muhammad Said Khan returned to Old Shamakhi and appointed a deputy to govern the new city. Bournoutian on the other hand, citing Bakikhanov, Fath-Ali Khan of Quba gained influence there, and "appointed his own governors, such as Aghasi Beg and Askar Beg, both members of the same family," without naming Muhammad Said.

In any case, Muhammad Said Khan oversaw a large rebuilding activity according to Gmelin. He forged an alliance with Muhammad Husayn Khan of Shaki and established a thriving trade environment. According to Gmelin, under Muhammad Said silk was exported throughout Persia and Russia; from the interior of Persia, various silk and cotton goods were brought into the city, various types of blankets, Moroccan leather, and lambskins were brought, while from Russia, indigo, sugar, tea, Dutch broadcloth, tin, steel, iron, lead, white paint, mirrors, knives, scissors, beads were imported. Shirvan silk was exported to Ottoman Empire and bartered for Brazil wood, steel and beads. Around 100 Tabrizi manufacturers established themselves in the city.

In 1765, Fath-Ali Khan demanded 10,000 roubles worth tribute from Shirvan. The underlying reason was that Southern Dagestani feudal lords had requested Fatali Khan’s permission to cross Quba en route to Shamakhi. Fatali Khan claimed that he refused and instead demanded the aforementioned sum from the Shamakhi Khanate to fund a military force against the Dagestanis. Although initially agreed to the proposal, later, a plague had broken out in Shamakhi, claiming 15–20 lives per day. Muhammad Said Khan, having somewhat consolidated his authority, responded that due to the widespread disease, it would be impossible to collect and pay the requested tax from the population. The refusal sharply worsened relations between the two khanates and gave a pretext to Fatali Khan to invade. This time, he also managed allegiance of Shaki Khanate.

A Russian consular report from Baku, dated 11 April 1765, states that the Shamakhi khan was “forced through negotiations to yield to the Shaki khan, and agreed to pay tribute to both him and the Quba khan; an agreement was concluded, though not yet ratified by the ruler of Quba.” But brothers later refused to honour this agreement. According to another consular report to the Collegium of Foreign Affairs dated 17 October 1765, Shirvan khans “would not, under any circumstances, agree to pay Fatali Khan of Quba any sum from the revenues of Shamakhi.” On 30 December 1765, combined forces advanced on Shamakhi—700 from Shaki and 7,000 from Quba. Soon the impregnable fortress of Mücü was also captured. Stunned by this turn of events, Muhammad Said of Shamakhi submitted.

Brothers sent two of their leading beys to Quba to initiate talks and present their terms. In response, the Quba authorities also dispatched a two-man delegation to the Shirvanese to begin peace discussions. The negotiations resulted in a mutual agreement. However, even this bilateral arrangement was eventually broken, and the threat of renewed conflict re-emerged. The Quba Khanate now began serious preparations for a new campaign. In addition to regular armed nökers and retainers, the army included militias and troops from Derbent, Quba, Baku, and Salyan, along with hired Tabasaran and Akushin mercenaries.

In early May 1768, Quba’s forces advanced on Shamakhi. Simultaneously, allied forces from the Shaki Khanate also moved in. Eyewitnesses described the mobilisation as so swift and forceful that the Shamakhi side had no time to organise a proper defence. Khans surrendered without a fight in June 1768. Both khans were detained by the khan of Shaki on request of Fatali. Muhammad Said Khan was arrested but later released, whereas Aghasi Khan was dealt with in characteristically brutal fashion. This was reportedly due to the perception that the ageing Muhammad Said, viewed as passive and militarily ineffective, posed little threat. In contrast, the younger and more energetic Aghasi, considered an implacable enemy of Quba and a serious political threat, was seen by the Quba authorities as needing permanent neutralisation. Aghasi khan was blinded by Muhammad Husayn, while his brother was imprisoned by Fath Ali. The khanate was divided between Shaki and Quba Khanates who appointed their own governors. The western part was governed by Hajji Muhammad's son, Manaf Zarnavai; while Fath Ali Khan installed his brother Abdulla bey as governor in east.

== Later life ==
Muhammad Said was kept in prison in Derbent by Fath Ali Khan for seven years. From 1768 to 1774, the khanate was considered abolished, and Shirvan was governed by a wali (governor) appointed by the Quba Khanate. Soon, new alliance fell apart, Shaki and Quba Khanates found themselves at odds again. Shaki's governor in west, Manaf Zarnavai planned takeover of the rest of Khanate for Shaki, however according to a Russian consular official in Baku, Ivan Matveev, as noted in a document dated 11 September 1768, plan ultimately failed. Shaki faction did not receive sufficient support among Shirvanese nobles, once it became clear that the plan involved installing Shaki's absolute rule in Shamakhi, without the involvement of local feudal elites. The Quba authorities, informed in advance by their supporters, acted preemptively. Fathali Khan arrived near New Shamakhi on 17 August 1768, encamping 2 km from the city. He then entered with 2,000 troops, captured Manaf bey along with three prominent elders, and sent them to Derbent. Fatali Khan annexed former two districts of Shirvan that was given to Shaki earlier.

According to researcher Hazi Abdullayev, Fath Ali khan later started bestow favours on Muhammad Said, in order to gain his loyalty. He briefly offered Muhammad Said to take over naibate in recently conquered territories, but he refused, considering it beneath his dignity. Fath Ali later attempted to compensate the losses of Muhammad Said khan by transferring silk goods from Muhammad Husayn Khan and his vizier Dost Muhammad. These goods (50–60 bales), disguised as merchandise belonging to Shaki merchants, were secretly brought by merchant Abdul Ali from Salyan for shipment by Russian vessel to Astrakhan. In a letter dated August 1768 to Consul Mikhail Sulyakov, Fatali Khan requested that these goods be located, removed from the vessel, and handed over to Muhammad Said’s agent, Kerbalayi Ali Quli. In the same letter, the Quba khan stated that when Shamakhi was taken, Muhammad Said’s property and the khanate treasury had been plundered by the very same Shaki ruler, Huseyn Khan, who had ordered Aghasi Khan’s eyes to be gouged out and later concealed his involvement. According to him, “now Muhammad Said is our friend and brother, and therefore he should be treated amicably and given a respectful welcome.” However, the goods in question were never recovered. Consul Sulyakov, acting in the interests of Russian trade and unwilling to intervene in the conflict between the Quba and Shaki khanates, refrained from taking any action.

Following disastrous defeat of Fathali in battle of Gavdushan, Muhammad Said was reinstated in New Shamakhi as a vassal in order to retain Quba suzerainty over Shirvan. Poruchik Pavel Batyrev, who visited the region at the time, reported that Muhammad Said “had no authority of his own and obeys Fatali Khan in all matters.” Aghasi Khan also returned to rule Shirvan Khanate in 1774 from his base in Alvand. Aghasi seemingly also accepted vassalage to Fatali Khan.

Ottoman sultan Abdulhamid I approached Caucasian khans in an effort to forge an alliance against Heraclius II and Russians. Both Muhammad Said Khan and Aghasi Khan, addressing the Ottoman governor of Çıldır, expressed readiness to join a mutual military operation in 1775/1776.

Alarmed by reunited brothers, seeking to exploit the situation through dynastic politics, Fatali Khan agreed to a marriage alliance—his sister Fatma Khanum was promised to Muhammad Said’s son, Muhammad Rza in 1779. This move was designed to neutralise Muhammad Said as a political threat and to sow discord between the brothers - a decision that enraged Aghasi Khan, who then left his refuge in Alvand and demanded sole authority from his elder brother. Muhammad Riza on the other hand, fled to court of Fatali Khan, who soon launched punitive invasion onto Shirvan. Though the two brothers united against him, they were defeated—Muhammad Said fled to Shaki, and Aghasi returned to Alvand. Despite several attempts at reconciliation, including sending gifts to Fatali Khan, their political position continued to weaken. Multiple sources confirm that Fatali Khan subsequently appointed Muhammad Rza as vassal khan of Shirvan. According to Adolf Berzhe, he ruled for 3 years.

According to Mirza Hasan Alkadari, Fatali Khan, angered by the brothers’ support for the Avar ruler Umma Khan, had both Aghasi and Muhammad Said arrested and executed in Baku. According to Butkov, his death was ordered by Fath Ali Khan and he was executed alongside his two sons in Salyan, 1788. Abbasgulu Bakikhanov characterizes him as someone "with a pure heart and a changeable disposition." Jacob Reineggs, who visited him towards end of his reign, described him as "an old, quiet, and honest man: for he has experienced frequent and tragic fates of all possible changes, which have made him indifferent toward hope and fear."

== Family ==
According to Adolf Berzhe, Muhammad Said was married to two wives and several children:

- Firangiz Khanum (m. 1751, d. 1776):
  1. Mahmud bey (d. 1788) – killed in youth by Fath Ali Khan
  2. Muhammad Riza Khan (1753 – 1788), puppet ruler of Shirvan Khanate, married to Fatma Khanum, sister of Fath Ali Khan
  3. Askar Khan (1756 –1820), ruler Shirvan Khanate for 6 months
  4. Hafsa Khanum (1764 –1815), m. 1805 to Musa bey, son of Muradkhan bey
- Mah Pari Khanum (m. 1756, d. 1790):
  1. Isgandar bey (d. 1788) – killed in youth by Fath Ali Khan
  2. Qasim Khan (1763 – 1828), ruler Shirvan Khanate for 2 years
  3. Halima Khanum (1765 – 1793), m. 1778 to her paternal cousin Murtuz Ali bey
  4. Anakhanum Khanum (1774 – ?) m. 1794 to her paternal cousin Shikh Ali bey

== Sources ==
- Abdullayev, Hazi (1965). Азербайджан в XVIII веке и взаимоотношения его с Россией [Azerbaijan in the 18th century and its relations with Russia] (in Russian). Изд-во Академии наук Азербайджанской ССР.
- Bakikhanov, Abbasgulu agha; Floor, Willem M.; Ǧawādī, Ḥasan; Bāqīẖānli, ʿAbbās-Quli Aġā (2009). The heavenly rose-garden: a history of Shirvan & Daghestan. Washington, DC: Mage Publ. ISBN 978-1-933823-27-0.
- Bayramova, Naila (2009). Şamaxı xanlığı [Shamakhi Khanate] (PDF) (in Azerbaijani). Baku: Təhsil.
- Berzhe, Adolf (1873). Кавказ и Закавказье за время управления генерал-лейтенанта маркиза Филиппа Осиповича Паулуччи и генерала от инфантерии Николая Федоровича Ртищева, 1811-1816 [The Caucasus and Transcaucasia during the administration of Lieutenant General Marquis Philip Osipovich Paulucci and General of Infantry Nikolai Fedorovich Rtishchev, 1811-1816]. Акты, собранные Кавказской археографической комиссией [Acts collected by the Caucasian Archaeographic Commission] (in Russian). Vol. 5. Caucasus Viceroyalty.
- Bournoutian, George A. (2021). From the Kur to the Aras: a military history of Russia's move into the South Caucasus and the first Russo-Iranian war, 1801-1813. Iran studies. Leiden: Brill. ISBN 978-90-04-44515-4.
- Butkov, Pyotr (1869). Материалы для новой истории Кавказа, с 1722 по 1803 год [Materials for a new history of the Caucasus, from 1722 to 1803] (in Russian). Saint Petersburg.
