= Muhammad Riza Khan =

18th-century ruler of Shirvan

Khan of Shirvan
- Reign: 1785–1789
- Predecessor: Muhammad Said Khan
- Successor: Fath-Ali Khan of Quba
- Born: 1753; Shamakhi, Shirvan Khanate
- Died: 1789 (aged 35–36); Quba, Quba Khanate
- Spouse: Fatima Khanum of Quba
- Tribe: Khanchobany
- Dynasty: House of Sarkar
- Father: Muhammad Said Khan
- Mother: Firangiz Khanum

Muhammad Riza Khan was a puppet khan of Shamakhi under Fath-Ali Khan of Quba in late the 18th century.

== Biography ==
He was born to Muhammad Said Khan of Shirvan and his first wife Firangiz khanum in 1753. His family belonged to House of Sarkar (Persian: آلِ سَرکار, romanized: Āl-e Sarkār) of Khanchobani tribe (Azerbaijani: Xançobanı, lit. 'Khan's shepherd'). He had younger full-brothers Askar Khan and Mahmud bey, in addition to half-brothers Isgandar bey and Qasim Khan. His full-sister Hamsa Khanum (1764 –1815) married to a local Shirvani bey while half-sisters, Halima Khanum (1765–1793) and Anakhanum Khanum (1774 – ?) married to their paternal cousins.

Muhammad was only 10 when his father and uncle started their dual-rule in Shirvan Khanate. He was arrested alongside his father and family in 1768 and taken to Derbent. Following disastrous defeat of Fath Ali in battle of Gavdushan in 1774, his father Muhammad Said was reinstated in New Shamakhi as a vassal to retain Quba suzerainty over Shirvan. Poruchik Pavel Batyrev, who visited the region at the time, reported that Muhammad Said "had no authority of his own and obeys Fatali Khan in all matters." Muhammad Riza's uncle Aghasi Khan also returned to rule Shirvan Khanate in 1774 from his base in Alvand. Aghasi seemingly also accepted vassalage to Fatali Khan.

Alarmed by reunited brothers, seeking to exploit the situation through dynastic politics, Fatali Khan agreed to a marriage alliance—his sister Fatma Khanum was married Muhammad Rza in 1779. This move was designed to neutralise Muhammad Said as a political threat and to sow discord between the brothers – a decision that enraged Aghasi Khan, who then left his refuge in Alvand and demanded share of authority from his elder brother. Muhammad Riza on the other hand, fled to court of Fatali Khan, who soon launched punitive invasion onto Shirvan. Though the two brothers united against him, they were defeated—Muhammad Said fled to Shaki, and Aghasi returned to Alvand. Despite several attempts at reconciliation, including sending gifts to Fatali Khan, their political position continued to weaken. Multiple sources confirm that Fatali Khan subsequently appointed Muhammad Rza as vassal khan of Shirvan. According to Adolf Berzhe, he ruled for 3 years.

According to Russian-Armenian major Averian Serebrov who was dispatched to the region in 1796, Muhammad Said returned to Shirvan as soon as Fatali Khan left the region and began to have say in its governance. Fath Ali Khan, unwilling to allow him authority, sought by every means to manoeuvre the province into his own control, nominally under his son-in-law's rule but without the influence of his father. He succeeded in this objective: agents of Fath Ali Khan surrounded and abducted Muhammad Said, brought him to Fath Ali Khan. He then sent him under guard to Salyan, where, by Fath Ali Khan's order, he was executed.

Muhammad Riza's rule didn't last long either. Subsequently, fearing that Muhammad Riza might seek revenge for his father's death, Fath Ali Khan exiled him to Quba, where he was also executed in 1789.

== Family ==
His only wife was Fatima Khanum, sister of Fath Ali Khan of Quba, to whom he was married in 1779. Their only child was Ibrahimkhan agha (1780–1839) who lived with his mother in Amsar in by 1796, however he was buried in Salyan, at the Baba-Samid cemetery. He married in 1821 Perinaz Khanum, a girl of common origin; she died in 1840 and was buried in Salyan. Their only child was Huri Pari Bike (b. 1824), who married to her first cousin once removed Allahquli bey, son of Mustafa Khan.

== Sources ==
- Abdullayev, Hazi (1965). Азербайджан в XVIII веке и взаимоотношения его с Россией [Azerbaijan in the 18th century and its relations with Russia] (in Russian). Изд-во Академии наук Азербайджанской ССР.
- Bakikhanov, Abbasgulu agha; Floor, Willem M.; Ǧawādī, Ḥasan; Bāqīẖānli, ʿAbbās-Quli Aġā (2009). The heavenly rose-garden: a history of Shirvan & Daghestan. Washington, DC: Mage Publ. ISBN 978-1-933823-27-0.
- Berzhe, Adolf (1873). Кавказ и Закавказье за время управления генерал-лейтенанта маркиза Филиппа Осиповича Паулуччи и генерала от инфантерии Николая Федоровича Ртищева, 1811–1816 [The Caucasus and Transcaucasia during the administration of Lieutenant General Marquis Philip Osipovich Paulucci and General of Infantry Nikolai Fedorovich Rtishchev, 1811–1816]. Акты, собранные Кавказской археографической комиссией [Acts collected by the Caucasian Archaeographic Commission] (in Russian). Vol. 5. Caucasus Viceroyalty.
- Bournoutian, George A. (2021). From the Kur to the Aras: a military history of Russia's move into the South Caucasus and the first Russo-Iranian war, 1801–1813. Iran studies. Leiden: Brill. ISBN 978-90-04-44515-4.
- Butkov, Pyotr (1869). Материалы для новой истории Кавказа, с 1722 по 1803 год [Materials for a new history of the Caucasus, from 1722 to 1803] (in Russian). Saint Petersburg.
