= Jacob Reineggs =

German physician and diplomat (1744–1793)

- Born: Christian Rudolf Ehlich; 28 November 1744; Eisleben, Electorate of Saxony
- Died: 7 April 1793 (aged 48) (Note: 7 April 1793 New Style; 27 March 1793 Old Style, as recorded in contemporary Western sources.); Saint Petersburg, Russian Empire
- Occupations: Physician; Diplomat; Naturalist; Actor
- Employer(s): Erekle II of Georgia; Grigory Potemkin
- Known for: Court physician to Erekle II; negotiation of the Treaty of Georgievsk (1783)
- Awards: Corresponding member, Göttingen Academy of Sciences (1786); member, German National Academy of Sciences Leopoldina (1792)
- Medical career
- Profession: Physician
- Field: Surgery, botany, chemistry

Jacob Reineggs (28 November 1744 – 7 April 1793), born Christian Rudolf Ehlich, was a German adventurer, physician, diplomat, and naturalist of the 18th century, known for his role as court physician and confidant of King Erekle II of Georgia and for his part in the negotiation of the Treaty of Georgievsk of 1783.

== Life ==
=== Early years and education ===
Reineggs was born on 28 November 1744 in Eisleben, Electorate of Saxony, as Christian Rudolf Ehlich, the son of a citizen and barber of the same city. He later adopted the surname Reineggs when he took up acting. In 1762 he was working as a barber's apprentice in Leipzig, where he also began to study medicine and chemistry, enrolling at the university under the name Christian Rudolf Oelich. His conduct there was reportedly so disruptive that he was eventually expelled.

=== Wandering years: Bohemia, Vienna, and Hungary ===
After leaving Leipzig, Reineggs led a peripatetic existence, eventually reaching Bohemia, where he fell in with a travelling theatrical company whose director had fallen ill. He stepped in and subsequently toured with the troupe through Bohemia, performing at Iglau, Znaim, and Brünn, before moving on to Moravia and finally reaching Vienna, where he appeared on stage under the name Reineggs in 1770. He found employment under Count Johann Karl von Kohary, the director of the theatre, with a stipend of 600 florins, while also attending public lectures on physic, botany, and chemistry.

His fortunes changed through a chance encounter: he successfully treated the coachman of the Dowager Princess of Liechtenstein, accepting no payment for the cure. Upon learning of this, the princess summoned him and promised him the same stipend for six years, on condition that he abandon the theatre, obtain a proper medical diploma, and apply himself seriously to his studies. In 1773, having received a pecuniary gift from his benefactress, he travelled to Tyrnau in Hungary, took a doctorate in medicine, and returned to Vienna to practise. Finding little success, he proceeded to Venice with Count Stuart, before travelling on to Turkey.

In preparation for an eventual journey to the East, Reineggs studied the Turkish language, revived his medical and surgical studies, attended the oriental academy in Vienna, and sought acquaintance with Armenians, Greeks, Turks, and other Asiatics residing in the capital.

=== Travels in Turkey and the Caucasus ===
In 1776 Reineggs landed at Smyrna, visited its antiquities, and sailed for Constantinople. His conduct there won him the protection of the British diplomatic mission and the esteem of the whole diplomatic corps, and he devoted himself to Arabic and Turkish. In October 1777, he set off with a caravan from Constantinople towards Tokat, where he arrived after twenty-five days. During the winter there, his reputation as a physician spread rapidly; he attended numerous invalids each morning and gained the friendship of the Mufti, Kadi, and Vaivode of the city.

He continued his journey through Armenia, visiting Erzurum and Echmiadzin. In a letter from Tiflis dated 21 January 1780, addressed to Professor Hacquet in Laybach, Reineggs described his extensive travels: from Baghdad in 1778, through Media, across Nineveh and Arbela, through the mountains of Armenia Major to the source of the Euphrates, and to the Caspian frontier of Azerbaijan.

During his time in the region he also visited Shamakhi, where he was received as a guest at the table of Muhammad Said Khan of Shirvan. He subsequently encountered Ibrahim Khalil Khan of Karabagh, who lay dangerously ill with a fever. Reineggs treated him using cantharides, a remedy entirely unknown in the East at the time, and the Khan recovered fully. In gratitude, Ibrahim Khan rewarded him lavishly, including a gift of a thousand pounds of raw silk, and the two men formed a close friendship. It was through this connection that Reineggs came to the attention of Erekle II: the strong personal ties between Ibrahim Khan and the Georgian king led to Ibrahim introducing Reineggs to the court at Tiflis, upon which Erekle extended a solemn embassy inviting him to enter his service.

Arriving in Tbilisi in 1774, he was received with great distinction and a warm friendship rapidly developed between the two men, who came to address one another as father and son. The King appointed him court physician and trusted adviser.

He mastered several Oriental languages during this period, including Georgian. He taught German at the Catholic Fathers' school in Tbilisi, opened a medical school, and established a school for the royal princes (the Batonishvili school), serving as one of the personal tutors of Davit and Alexander, grandson and son of Erekle II respectively. He taught artillery to Georgian military officers, devoted considerable time to mining affairs, and managed the Tbilisi printing press, for which he had ordered machinery from Vienna.

When the King's eldest son fell dangerously ill of a violent fever, Reineggs restored him to health, receiving in gratitude a thousand piastres in specie, rich garments, and a domain of 500 families, yielding a rental of approximately 4,000 florins annually. He translated Sonnenfel's Principles of Police into Persian — a text the King himself then rendered into Georgian and had printed at the Tiflis press. He likewise introduced improved methods of smelting noble metals, instructed the Georgians in founding, erected furnaces, iron and steel manufactories, cast and bored iron guns, and built large powder-mills and magazines.

=== Diplomatic role and the Treaty of Georgievsk ===
Reineggs's detailed knowledge of Georgian affairs attracted the attention of Prince Grigory Potemkin, who summoned him to Saint Petersburg and made him one of his most trusted confidants. According to his own journal, Reineggs left Tiflis on 10 July 1781 and, after a dangerous twenty-five-day journey, arrived at the Russian fortress of Mosdok, where he became acquainted with General Fabrizian, who took him to Petersburgh. There he was received with favour but required to observe strict secrecy. The only person to whom he communicated a description of the state of Georgia was Professor Peter Simon Pallas, who subsequently published it.

In 1782 he was sent back to Georgia on a special mission to win over both Erekle and Solomon I of Imereti to the Russian side. Acting as Russian Resident, he played a significant role in the negotiations preceding the Treaty of Georgievsk, by which the Kingdom of Kartli-Kakheti came under the sovereignty of Russia. The act was signed at Fort Georgievskaja on 24 July O.S. (4 August N.S.) 1783.

=== Later life in Saint Petersburg ===
Upon returning to Saint Petersburg, Reineggs began appearing publicly in his Persian costume, exciting considerable attention at court. A troop of inquisitive courtiers made remarks on his dress, assuming he could speak no language but his own, until he confounded them by addressing them in Russian, then in French, and finally in German. For his public services he received a respectable pension, was made a college-Assessor, and was afterwards attached to the imperial college of physicians as a counsellor.

In 1786 he was elected a corresponding member of the Göttingen Academy of Sciences. On 5 January 1792 he was elected a member of the Leopoldina under the epithet Jason VI.

In 1789 he accompanied Prince Potemkin to Moldavia to negotiate a peace between the Russians and Turks, returning in 1790. During the course of his travels he had become heavily habituated to opium, taking ten grains or more daily, which he attributed to violent nosebleeds that afflicted him particularly in December and January. One cold morning, entering a post-office unusually heated and filled with noxious effluvia from the assembled crowd, he was seized with apoplexy; a surgeon called at the moment incautiously bled him, which probably hastened his end. He died on 7 April 1793 (N.S.).

== Works ==
Among his best-known works is the Allgemeine historisch-topographische Beschreibung des Kaukasus (General Historical-Topographical Description of the Caucasus), published posthumously in two volumes (Gotha/Hildesheim, 1796–97), edited from his papers by Friedrich Enoch Schröder. An English translation by C. Taylor appeared in London in 1807 under the title A General, Historical, and Topographical Description of Mount Caucasus. A letter from Tiflis dated 21 January 1780, addressed to Professor Hacquet in Laybach and describing his travels through Mesopotamia, Persia, and the Caucasus, was included in the English preface and remains a primary biographical source.
