= Shirvan Khanate =

Khanate in modern-day Azerbaijan from 1761 to 1820

Khanate of Shirvan خانات شروان
- 1761–1820
- The South Caucasus in the last quarter of the 18th century. The Shirvan Khanate is located on the far right
- Status: Khanate; Under Iranian suzerainty
- Capital: Old Shamakhi; New Shamakhi (Ağsu)
- Official languages: Persian (official)
- Common languages: Azerbaijani
- Ethnic groups: Tatars (later known as Azerbaijanis), Kurds, Armenians, Jews, Russians, Iranians (1820 survey)
- Religion: Shia Islam
- Khan
- History
  - Overthrow of Sardar Khan Qaraqlu: 1761
  - Annexation by Imperial Russia: 1820
Preceded by	Succeeded by
Afsharid Iran	Russian Empire
- Today part of: Azerbaijan

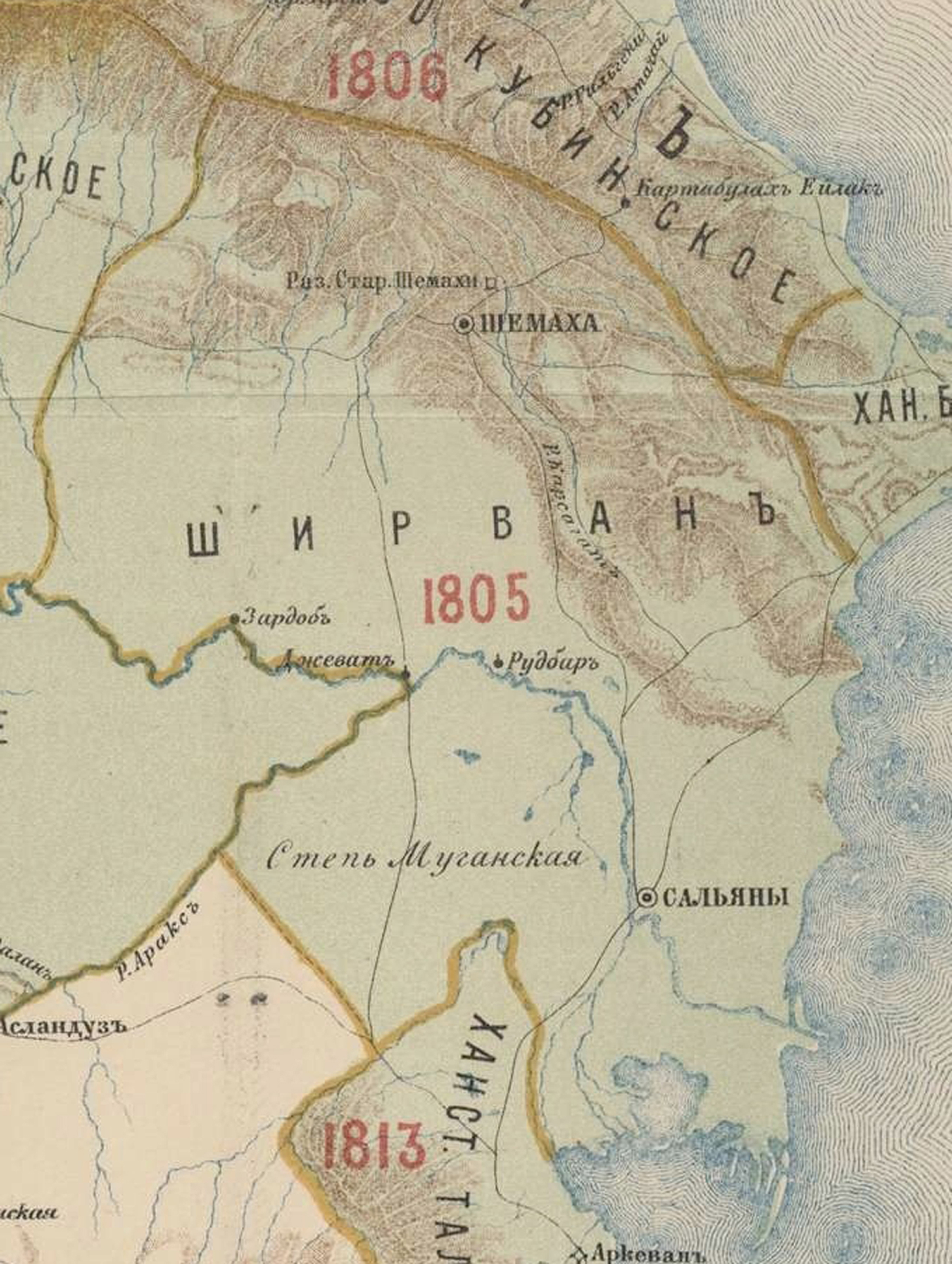
Map of Shamakhy Khanate in 1805 (according to a 1902 Russian map)

Shirvan Khanate (Persian: خانات شیروان, romanized: Khānāt-e Shirvan) or Shamakhy khanate was a Caucasian khanate under Iranian suzerainty, which controlled the Shirvan region around Shamakhy from 1761 to 1820.

== Background ==
Under the Safavid dynasty of Iran, Shirvan was a leading silk manufacturer and its principal city, Shamakhi, became an important place for trade. In 1724, most of Shirvan was annexed to the Ottoman Empire by the Treaty of Constantinople. In 1734, the Iranian military leader Nader recovered Shirvan and installed Mohammad Mehdi Khan as its beglarbegi (governor-general).

The following year, Mohammad Mehdi Khan was killed by rebellious dignitaries of the province. They had been incited by the governor of Darband, Morad-Ali Soltan Ostajlu. Mohammad Qasem Beg, who was a prominent dignitary of Shirvan and Nader's ishikaghasi-bashi (chamberlain), successfully appealed to Nader to pardon Shirvan. In 1735, Nader had the inhabitants of Shamakhi resettled in New Shamakhi (Aqsu), situated 18 miles north of the Kur River. He then installed as Sardar Khan Qaraqlu the new governor of Shirvan, and soon appointed Heydar Khan Afshar as the ruler of both Shirvan and Darband. In 1743, the Safavid pretender Sam Mirza led a local rebellion, overthrowing Heydar Khan. In 1761, the Zand ruler Karim Khan Zand (r. 1751–1779) approved the request of the inhabitants of Old Shamakhi to overthrow Sardar Khan Qaraqlu and install their own applicant, Hajji Mohammad Ali Khan, as the governor of Shirvan.

== History ==
Hajji Mohammad Ali Khan governed Shirvan until 1763, when Fath-Ali Khan of Quba gained influence there, and appointed his own governors, such as Aghasi Beg and Askar Beg, both members of the same family. Askar Beg, along with supporters from the Khanchoban tribe, returned to Old Shamakhi, and soon became powerful enough to establish control over New Shamakhi. Aghasi Beg and another family member Mohammad Sa'id successfully acquired the title of khan from Karim Khan Zand. The family were in control of Shirvan until 1767, when a combined army from Quba and Shakki captured Old Shamakhi. Fath-Ali Khan of Quba had Mohammad Sa'id imprisoned, while Hosein Khan of Shakki had Aghasi Khan blinded. Shirvan was subsequently divided between Quba and Shakki. Nevertheless, Aghasi Khan later managed to restore his control over Shirvan, in 1774. He was later succeeded by his son Mostafa Khan.

In 1790, Shirvan khans restored their authorities.

After the massacre in Ganja, Mostafa Khan asked the central government in Tehran for assistance, in order to prevent Tsitsianov's advance. The government responded by sending an army under general Pir Qoli Khan Qajar. However, when the general had reached the Mughan plain, he found out that Mostafa Khan had entered negotiations with the Russians. Mostafa Khan hoped that the Russians would recognize a Shirvan Khanate "enlarged" to the boundaries of the Shirvanshah's of the Medieval era. Though Mostafa Khan was uncomfortable with Tsitsianov's proposal, the latter threatened that if he would not agree with his terms, he would replace Mostafa with his younger brother (who was reportedly enthusiastic about it). Anyhow, the Russians invaded the khanate, and on 6 January 1806, Mostafa Khan was forced to submit.

"I, Mostafa Khan of Shirvan, in my name and that of my heirs, remove myself forever from the vassalage or honors of Persia (Iran) or any other state. I declare before the entire world that I do not recognize anyone as my liege, except His Imperial Majesty, the Emperor of All the Russias, and His heirs to the throne. I promise to be a loyal slave to that throne. I swear this by the Holy Qur'an."

Mostafa Khan was allowed to administer the khanate and had to give an annual tribute in gold rubles to the Russians. Furthermore, he had to send hostages to Tiflis (Tbilisi), which had recently been annexed and transformed into the "base" of the Russian Caucasus Viceroyalty. Lastly, he also had to provide food and accommodation for the Russian garrisons. After Tsitsianov was killed in Baku in 1806, Mostafa Khan repudiated his allegiance to the Russians, and re-submitted himself to the shah.

Things changed when Aleksey Yermolov took office as the new Russian commander-in-chief in the Caucasus, in 1816. A staunch Russian imperialist, Yermolov was committed to bringing the entire Caucasus under the Russian sway. He wanted to establish the Aras river as the border between Iran and Russia at all costs, and was therefore determined to conquer the last remaining khanates under Iranian rule; the Erivan Khanate and the Nakchivan Khanate. When Ismail, the khan of Shaki, died in 1819 without any heir, Yermolov annexed the entity. Realizing what was going to happen to himself, Mostafa Khan fled to mainland Iran in 1820 with his son; Yermolov did not waste any time to annex the Shirvan Khanate.

Ethnic Map of the Shirvan Khanate in 1820

Several years later, in violation of the Gulistan treaty (1813), the Russians invaded Iran's Erivan Khanate. This sparked the final bout of hostilities between the two; the Russo-Iranian War of 1826-1828. Crown prince Abbas Mirza led a full-scale attack in the summer of 1826 order to recover the Iranian territories that had been lost by the Gulistan treaty. The war started off well for the Iranians; they quickly recaptured Ganja, Shirvan and Shaki amongst others, and performed attacks on Tiflis. The government then reinstated Mostafa in Shirvan. However, just a few months later, the tide had completely turned with the Iranian army suffering decisive defeats against the militarily superior Russians. In September 1826, Abbas Mirza was defeated at Ganja by Ivan Paskevich, and thus the army had to retreat over the Aras. Mostafa Khan, accompanied by a small retinue, fled once again to mainland Iran.

== Administration ==
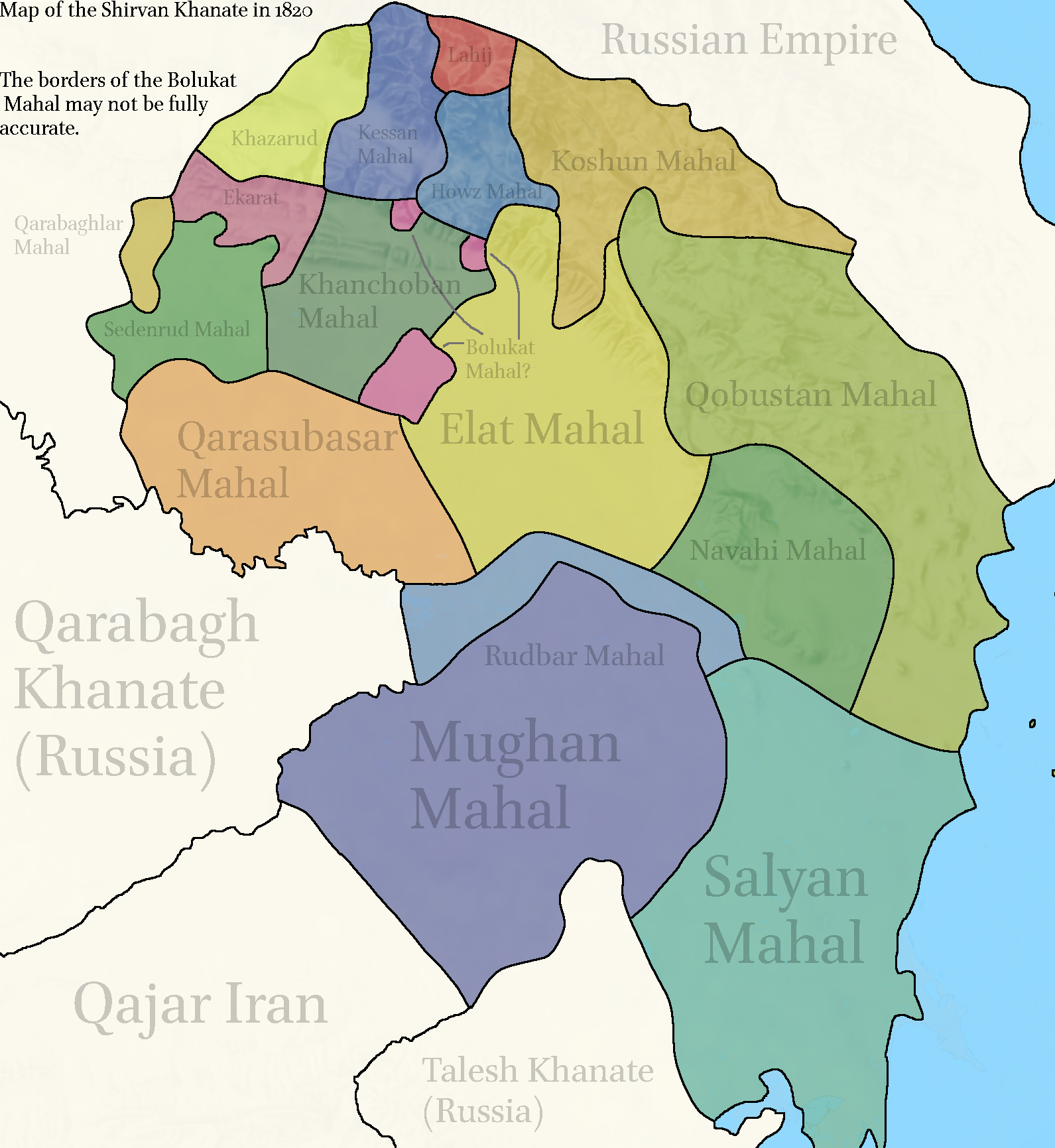
Map of the Shirvan Khanate with its mahals at the time of its annexation in 1820

The Khanate was composed of 17 mahals (districts):

1. Salyan Mahal
2. Howz Mahal
3. Sedenrud Mahal
4. Khanchoban Mahal
5. Elat Mahal
6. Koshun Mahal
7. Qarasubasar Mahal
8. Kessan Mahal
9. Ekeret Mahal
10. Qobustan Mahal
11. Lahij Mahal
12. Rudbar Mahal
13. Mughan Mahal
14. Navahin Mahal
15. Qarabaghlar Mahal
16. Boluket Mahal
17. Khazarud Mahal

== Khans ==
1. Hajji Mohammad Ali Khan (1761–1763)
2. Aghasi Khan and Muhammad Said Khan (1763–1768)
3. Fath-Ali Khan of Quba (1768–1774)
4. Aghasi Khan and Muhammad Said Khan (2nd reign, 1774–1782)
5. Muhammad Riza Khan (1782-1785)
6. Fath-Ali Khan of Quba (1785–1789)
7. Askar Khan (1789)
8. Qasim Khan (1789–1792)
9. Mostafa Khan (1792–1820)

== Sources ==
- Atkin, Muriel (1980). Russia and Iran, 1780-1828. Minneapolis: University of Minnesota Press. ISBN 978-0816656974.
- Bournoutian, George A. (2016a). "Quick Overview". The 1819 Russian Survey of the Khanate of Sheki: A Primary Source on the Demography and Economy of an Iranian Province Prior to its Annexation by Russia. Costa Mesa, California: Mazda Publishers. ISBN 978-1568593159.
- Bournoutian, George A. (2016b). The 1820 Russian Survey of the Khanate of Shirvan: A Primary Source on the Demography and Economy of an Iranian Province prior to its Annexation by Russia. Gibb Memorial Trust. ISBN 978-1909724808.
- Bournoutian, George (2021). From the Kur to the Aras: A Military History of Russia's Move into the South Caucasus and the First Russo-Iranian War, 1801–1813. Brill. ISBN 978-9004445154.
- Cronin, Stephanie, ed. (2013). Iranian-Russian Encounters: Empires and Revolutions since 1800. Routledge. ISBN 978-0415624336.
- Dowling, Timothy C., ed. (2014). Russia at War: From the Mongol Conquest to Afghanistan, Chechnya, and Beyond [2 volumes]. ABC-CLIO. ISBN 978-1598849486.
- Tapper, Richard (1997). Frontier Nomads of Iran: A Political and Social History of the Shahsevan. Cambridge University Press. ISBN 978-0521583367.
