= Fath-Ali Khan of Quba =

Ruler of the Quba Khanate (AD 1758–1789)

Khan of Quba
- Reign: 1758 – 2 April [O.S. 22 March] 1789
- Predecessor: Huseyn Ali Khan
- Successor: Ahmad Khan
- Born: 1736; Quba, Quba Khanate, Afsharid Iran
- Died: 2 April 1789 (aged 52–53); Baku, Baku Khanate
- Buried: Bibi-Heybat Mosque, Baku
- Father: Huseyn Ali Khan
- Mother: Pari Jahan of Kaitag

Fatali Khan or Fath-Ali Khan of Quba (Persian: فتحعلی‌خان قبه‌ای; 1736 – April 2, 1789) was a khan of the Quba Khanate (1758–1789) who also managed to dominate the Derbent, Baku, Talysh and Shirvan Khanates, as well as the Salyan Sultanate during much of his reign.

== Early years ==
Fatali was born in 1736 in Quba to Husayn Ali Khan of Quba Khanate and Peri Jahan-Bike, daughter of Ahmad Khan, Utsmi of Kaitags. He was related to other Dagestani rulers, such as Umma Khan V, who was his maternal cousin, Amir Hamza, his cousin and brother-in-law, as well as Utsmi of Kaitags, among others. According to the 19th-century military historian Isgandar bey Hajinski (1809–1878), he had no special education and "spent his youth just as sons of other khans, i.e. in idleness." He was sent to subjugate Salyan Sultanate in 1755 or 1756 by his father, a mission he accomplished successfully.

His father died in 1758 at the age of 49, leaving the throne to his young son.

== Reign ==
Just seven days after his father's death, the brother of Aghasi Khan of Shirvan, Agharazi beg, invaded the Barmak Mahal of Quba and carried off 200 families. In response, Fatali Khan set out to Shirvan and captured about 400 families and settled them onto his possessions, killing Agharazi in a battle near Old Shamakhi.

Fatali, to consolidate his rule in the khanate, introduced several legal reforms. He abolished the system of naibate, who were in charge of taxation of districts of the khanate. Instead, he charged ketkhudas (stewards of villages) with this job, which would be overseen by yasauls, directly answering to khan himself.

=== Campaign in Derbent, Shaki and Baku ===
Soon after victory in Quba, Fatali started to expand his influence. According to Abbasgulu Bakikhanov, he besieged Derbent in 1759 when the inhabitants sent messages inviting him to remove Tahir bey, then their ruler. He took territories of Derbent on the right bank of the Samur River – Mushkur, Niyazoba, Shabran, Rustov, Beshbarmag and also villages of Ulus district from Derbent's khan. In the same year, he campaigned against Gazikumukh Khanate, whose khan Muhammad recently killed Aghakishi beg, Khan of Shaki, and defeated him, installing Muhammad Husayn Khan Mushtaq in his place.

Later in 1765, Fatali Khan annexed all of Derbent Khanate with the help of Tarki Shamkhalate, Kaitag Utsmiate, and the Principality of Tabasaran. Subordinating Derbent, Fatali gave a portion of land revenues from Derbent Khanate to Shamkhal and Utsmi, while the ruler of Tabasaran was given monetary compensation. Derbent's ruler Muhammad Hussein Khan was blinded and sent with his five-year-old son Ali beg to Quba, and then to Baku, where he was kept until he died in 1768. Ali lived as the hostage of Khan in Baku until 1796.

Fatali married Tuti Bike, his cousin and sister of Kaitag utsmi Amir Hamza III, in 1766. Despite this, he refused to marry his younger half-sister Khadija Bike to Amir Hamza. Instead, he married her to Malik Muhammad Khan, son of Baku's Khan Mirza Muhammad I, effectively subordinating the Baku Khanate to himself. Control over the ports of Baku, Derbent, and Salyan, as well as their Caspian commerce in salt and crude oil, provided Khan money and reputation.

Disgruntled over the marriage refusal, Amir Hamza captured Derbent and held it for 3 days with the excuse of visiting his sister. Fatali Khan later drove Amir Hamza and his Kaitag tax collectors from Derbent and took away the revenue villages which he presented to Amir Hamza. Fatali then appointed Eldar bek, nephew of Muhammad Khan of Gazikumukh, as a steward of Derbent. These steps further alienated the Dagestani lords from Fatali, and they started to see him as a regional rival.

=== Campaign in Shamakhi ===
In 1767/8, in alliance with Muhammad Husayn Khan Mushtaq of Sheki, he invaded Shamakhi, which was ruled by Aghasi Khan and Muhammad Said Khan brothers. Several Dagestani rulers, including Akusha-Dargo Union and Principality of Tabasaran, also joined the march. After victory on the battlefield, the brothers wanted to negotiate. Muhammad Said khan himself went to Fatali Khan's court while Aghasi headed to Shaki. Aghasi khan was blinded by the khan of Shaki while his brother was imprisoned by Fatali.

Fatali Khan and Muhammad Huseyn Khan divided the lands of Shirvan Khanate between themselves. The Kessan and Sadanrud districts were given to Shaki, while Fatali took the rest. Fatali ordered the destruction of New Shamakhi and a resettlement of the residents to the older Shamakhi. In one of the documents of period it was written that: “…Fatali Khan gave New Shamakhi to Huseyn Khan, but took himself the older one". Beginning from 1768, in official Russian documents and titular appeals, Fatali was named "high-degree and highly respected Khan of Derbent, Quba and Shamakhi".

Manaf Zarnavai, a naib of the Muhammad Huseyn (and son of former Hajji Mohammad Ali Khan) in New Shamakhi conspired to seize Fatali's lands by force, but Fatali's informants forewarned him, leading him to raise an army of 15,000 and invade the rest of the khanate on 17 August 1768, arresting Manaf himself. The Shaki armies were crushed by the Quba and Gazikumukh alliance on 20 September 1768, Shirvan was fully annexed to the Quba Khanate. A peace agreement was signed in July 1769.

According to Stepan Sharipin and Egor Zamyatin, Russian merchants from Astrakhan, "Huseyn khan wanted to possess all seized lands in Shamakhi and then to be its ruler, but no one can repudiate Fatali Khan from it."

Meanwhile, the blinded ex-ruler of Shamakhi, Aghasi Khan, escaped and urged Shaki to attack Fatali to retake Shirvan. This alliance was joined by Muhammad IV, Nutsal of Avars. He sent an armed detachment under his sons Bulach and Muhammad Mirza. The warring parties met at the outskirts of Shamakhi and decided to negotiate first. However, soon a fight broke out and turned into a full-blown battle. Both sons of Avar Khan died during the battle, while the khans of Shaki and Shamakhi escaped the scene.

In 1774, Avar nuts again marched on Shamakhi and captured the city briefly. In response, Fatali set out to Shirvan with an army and detachment led by Malik Mahammad Khan, khan of Baku, in alliance with his traditional allies Akusha-Dargo Union and Principality of Tabasaran. Nutsal was defeated near Old Shamakhi. Fatali promised him safety and invited him to discuss terms, where Muhammad was murdered by Dargins of Akusha.

=== Struggle in Dagestan ===
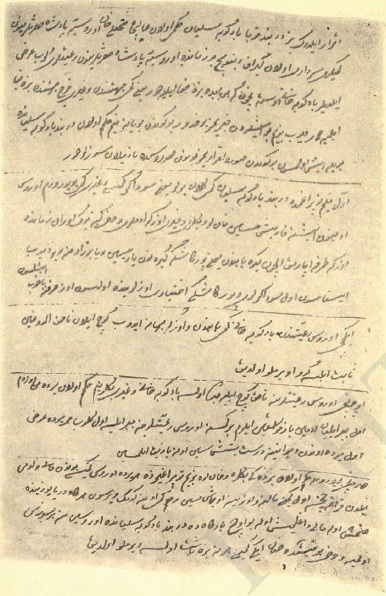

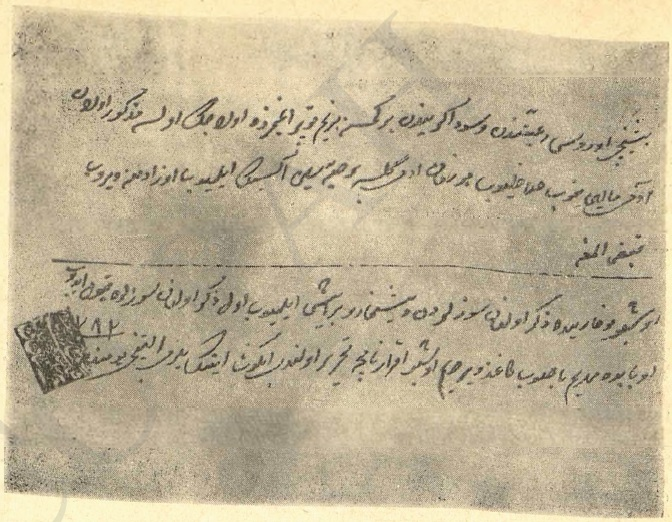
The commitment made by the Quba Khanate to Russia in 1782 on trade. The text of the obligation is written in Azerbaijani with the seal of Fatali Khan attached

The murder of Avar Khan alarmed the neighboring rulers in Dagestan. New Avar leader Umma Khan tried to forge an anti-Quba alliance with other Dagestani and Caucasian feudal lords by marrying his sister Bakhtika to Ibrahim Khalil Khan of Karabakh.

Having gathered a 4,000-strong army, the coalition was led by Amir Hamza, who marched into Quba but retreated north where he was ambushed by Fatali's armies. Nevertheless, the coalition defeated Fatali's army of 8,000 in the battle of Gavdushan, near the city of Khudat, in July 1774, forcing him to flee to Salyan. Muhammad the Toothless of the Dagestani forces perished during the battle; Eldar-beg, Fatali's viceroy in Derbent, and Maysum Shaykh-Ali of Tabasaran were killed on the Quba side.

Muhammad of Gazikumukh seized Quba as a result, while Aghasi Khan re-established himself in Shirvan. Meanwhile, Amir Hamza attempted to capture Derbent, which was ruled by his sister Tuti Bike during the absence of her husband. Amir, accompanying body of perished Tishsiz Muhammad, approached the city and informed his sister that Fatali Khan had died and that he brought the body. Tuti, according to legend, ordered the city’s defenders to open fire, which forced Amir Hamza to retreat to Mushkur. Soon Amir Hamza gathering an army, raided Baku Khanate and besieged Derbent. Meanwhile, Fatali entered Derbent and started gathering adherents.

While in a difficult situation, Fatali sent his envoy Mirza Bey Bayat from Salyan to Petersburg with a letter in which he appealed to Empress Catherine II for help, offering vassalage to Russian Empire in return. The Empress sent 2,350 soldiers under the command of General Johann von Medem in 1775. The arrival of Russian army alarmed Muhammad of Gazikumukh, who evacuated Quba; it was then retaken by Fatali. The Khan met von Medem near Darvag and led them to Derbent. In response, Amir Hamza raised the siege of Derbent and tried to battle Medem, but was defeated by the Russian army in Iran-Kharab. Fatali recaptured Derbent and sent keys to the city to Catherine II, also asking her to grant him citizenship of Russia.

On 10 May 1775, Fatali marched on Kaitag Utsmiate and Principality of Tabasaran with a Russian detachment led by major Cridner. Amir Hamza attacked them near Bashlykent, "but he was overthrown by an action of the artillery with great losses and took to flight." According to Mirza Hasan Alkadari, Fatali also defeated Muhammad of Gazikumukh's armies and took neighboring Kura plain.

The anti-Quba coalition asked for peace and offered hostages, but also demanded Fatali to vacate Derbent, a condition which Russian command rejected. In March and April 1776, the sides convened a meeting in Darvag. A peace consensus was reached in the April meeting, according to which the Kaitags and Tabasarans were required to leave Derbent and Quba and not to interfere in trade between Russia and Quba. The Russian envoy at the meeting, Major Fromgold, reported that "there will never be a desired calmness here. Despite Utsmi [of Kaitags] and Qadi [of Tabasaran] agreed not to harm the [Fatali] Khan, it is a matter of time for them to only turn on him again".

To further weaken his foes, Fatali drew Shikhmardan Bek, second son of Muhammad of Gazikumukh Khan, to his side. Fatali granted him a part of a Kura district which had earlier belonged to Derbent Khanate, and the revenues of Guney district that belonged Quba. He also granted Amir Hamza's nephew Muhammad beg 100 families from Quba and founded the eponymous village of Mamedkala for him.

Fatali also aided the Tabasaran princes Muhammad Husayn, Sohrab, Shir Ali, and Mustafa, whose ruling cousin Novruz bek was killed by Ali Qoli in 1776. Fatali then detained Ali Qoli in Derbent and exiled him to Salyan, and installed Muhammad Husayn beg as new prince. Kizlyar's Russian commandant wrote to the government that Fatali was more powerful now that he could attack Kaitag Utsmi with help from Tabasaran.

=== Relations with Russian, Ottoman Empires and Persia ===
When war between Russia and the Ottoman Empire broke out in 1768, the Porte unsuccessfully attempted to draw Fatali to their side. A contemporary Russian report said that "Recently, Turks sent some officers to the Khan of Quba, who rules Derbent, and he will persuade lezgis to arm against Russia in favor of the Porte". Messengers of Crimea's khan Qırım Giray also came to Fatali Khan with a request to come over to Porte's side and oppose Russia, a request he ignored. He also refused a request to let the Ottoman army pass through his territory, and advised other rulers not to collaborate with them.

In 1768, Talysh Khan Gara Khan's lands were invaded by Gilaki Hedayat-Allah Khan. Gara Khan's brother Kalb Ali (or Karbalai) Sultan appealed to Fatali for help. Seeing this as an opportunity to extend his influence, Fatali demanded the release of Gara Khan under the pretext that the Talysh beys recognized him as their overlord and pledged to pay tribute, and therefore Gara Khan should be released and returned to Lankaran.

In July 1769 Russian consul to Baku informed the authorities that Fatali refused the request of the Sultan's government to act against Russia, and refused to accept gifts delivered to him. In September 1770 one of the diplomatic representatives of Russia wrote that "Fatali Khan didn’t show any inclination to their side; indeed, he doesn’t want to begin anything against Russia, except a continuing benevolence."

Despite Fatali's repeated requests for official protection from the Russian government, the latter didn not want to complicate relations with Persia and the Ottoman Empire, nor to change the order of political forces in the South Caucasus. Count Panin, minister of foreign affairs, wrote to Fatali that the Empress "confers him to the goodwill of Russian Empire for his diligence", but could not accept him to citizenship, pointing out that doing so would be a breach of agreement between Russia, Iran, and the Ottoman Empire; besides which, Fatali was an Iranian subject.

In September 1775, Catherine II ordered the President of the College of War Grigory Potemkin to give the keys of Derbent back following the Turkish pressure. Soon the Russian army was withdrawn from Dagestan to Kizlyar.

Meanwhile Karim Khan Zand, the contender for the Iranian throne, approached Fatali and unsuccessfully asked for his allegiance.

=== Campaign of Gilan ===
In summer of 1781, Agha Mohammad Khan Qajar's army conquered Gilan Khanate and its ruler Hedayat-Allah Khan was forced to seek asylum with Fatali Khan. Fatali sent an army of 9,000 to Gilan in alliance with Tarki Shamkhalate and Kaitag Utsmiate; the general command was carried out by the Nāẓir Mirza bey Bayat. This army ousted the forces of Agha Mohammad Khan Qajar and reestablished Hidayat Khan's reign in Gilan, forcing Qajar to return to Gilan.

=== Struggle in South Caucasus ===
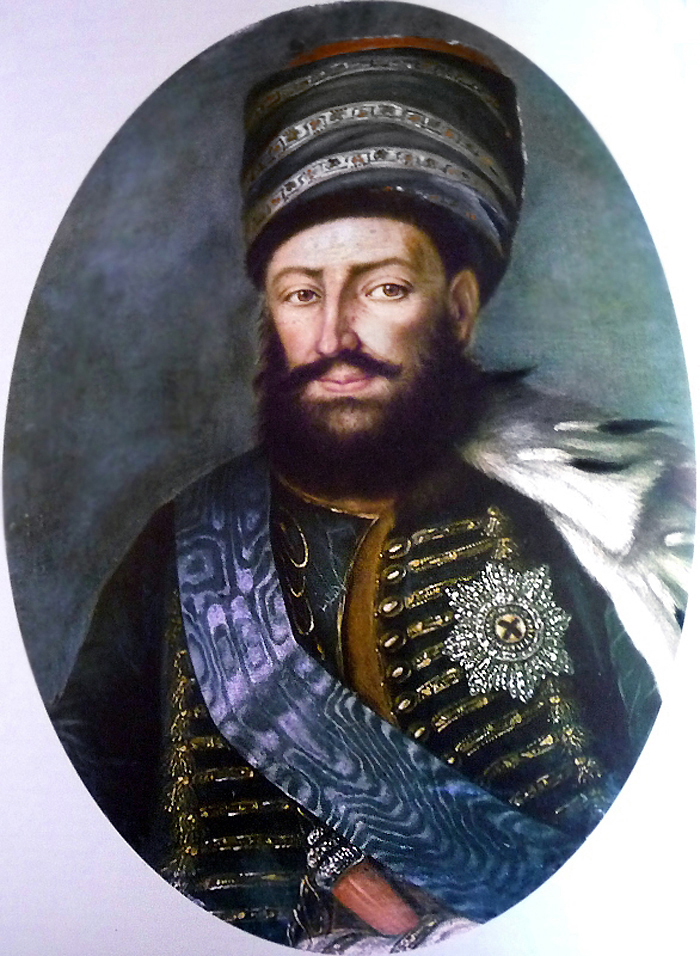
Erekle II - king of Kartli-Kakheti

Emboldened by his successes, Fatali Khan desired to extend his influence to the rest of the South Caucasus. He invaded Karabakh Khanate in 1780 by crossing the Kura River, but the Georgian king Erekle II helped Ibrahim Khalil Khan by sending him a detachment under the command of princes George and David. In August of that year, the Khan undertook an unsuccessful campaign, but by the beginning of 1781, he had penetrated deep into Karabakh. Meanwhile, his brother-in-law and vassal Malik Muhammad Khan was captured in Karabakh and was later released. Seeing this as a humiliation, Fatali appointed 11-year-old Mirza Muhammad Khan II as Baku khan and forced his father to go on pilgrimage in 1781. Thanks to his sister acting as regent for khan, Fatali became true ruler of Baku.

He also released the brother of Aghasi Khan, Muhammad Said, and reinstated him in Shirvan Khanate. He then married his sister Fatima to Muhammad Said's son Muhammad Reza, causing rivalry between the two brothers and thus weakening Shirvan.

Seeing Heraclius as an obstacle in his campaign for dominion in the Caucasus, Fatali supported Prince Alexander – an aspirant to the throne of Kartli-Kakheti – accompanied by Prince Alexander Amilakhvari in August 1782. Fatali's harboring of a potential rival to the Georgian throne was one of the factors that forced Heraclius II to seek Russian protection. Fatali gave them up to the Russian government only after Treaty of Georgievsk.

Fatali later marched on Karabakh Khanate in 1783 in alliance with Haji Khan, and unsuccessfully besieged Ibrahim Khalil Khan in Shusha fortress. Ibrahim Khalil then armed Muhammad Hasan to depose Haji, who fled to Aghasi Khan. Aghasi returned Haji to Shaki, where he was killed. Deprived of an important ally, Fatali returned to the south in spring of 1784 and attacked Karabakh ally Ardabil Khanate, pushing out Ibrahim Khalil's in-law Nazarali Khan Shahsevan, seizing Ardabil and Meshkin. He then appointed Hasan Khan Shahseven of Javad as a governor to Ardabil, and Khudaverdi bey to Meshkin. Not wanting a new escalation with Qajar Iran, Potemkin demanded that Fatali withdraw his troops. Soon Fatali withdrew to Quba, preparing another campaign in Shirvan.

In 1785, Fatali forced Gara Khan of Talysh to be his vassal. Gara was replaced by Mir Mustafa Khan in 1786, who was in Fatali's custody. Now in charge of entire Caucasian coast of Caspian Sea, Fatali decided to march on Shirvan Khanate.

In 1785, Mehrali bey, who was Ibrahim Khalil Khan's brother, was ambushed on his way from Baku to Shirvan by Ahmed Khan, son of Aghasi Khan of Shirvan. Fatali sent the body back to Shusha. Now deprived of an important ally, Aghasi Khan submitted to Fatali, who sent him to Quba with his sons. Fatali then moved on to Shaki to defeat Muhammad Hasan Khan. Muhammad Hasan was forced to make peace by marrying Huri Khanum, sister of Fatali Khan, and married his own sister Tubu Khanum to Fatali.

Fatali forged an alliance with Tarki Shamkhalate, marrying his son Ahmad Khan to Kichik Bike, daughter of Shamkhal Bammat II, in 1787. His old enemy Amir Hamza also died that year and was succeeded by his brother Ustar Khan, who was more friendly to Fatali.

Meanwhile, Fatali kept the ex-Shirvan Aghasi and his sons Ahmad and Muhammad in Qonaqkənd under house arrest. Muhammad Said, concerned by Fatali's possible alliance with Aghasi, fled to Shaki, while his son Muhammad Reza came to Fatali. Fatali ordered Muhammad Reza to escort his uncle and cousins to prison in Baku, and appointed Muhammad Riza as the new Khan of Shirvan. Fatali also demanded Muhammad Hasan Khan return Muhammad Said and his two other sons Mahmud and Iskandar, who were sent to Salyan to be imprisoned.

At the end of 1786, Umma Khan began a campaign against Shamakhi. Shemakha was captured and razed, and the inhabitants killed. Fatali was besieged in Aghsu for nine months, supported by Agha Muhammad Khan's brother Morteza Qoli. However, Fatali was forced to enter into negotiations with Umma Khan, betrothed him his daughter as a future wife (this marriage never took place), and handed over the revenues of Salyan and 200,000 rubles of indemnity. Not achieving their target, Sarkar princes left for Akhalkalaki in Ottoman Empire. In 1788, Fatali ordered the execution of the Khans of Shamakhi with their sons, and his own son-in-law Mahammad Reza.

This series of executions again alarmed the Dagestani rulers. In 1788, Ali Soltan, Khan of Mehtuli, soon marched on Quba in alliance with Muhammad Hasan Khan and Umma Khan, capturing Aghsu and the bulk of the territory. Later the Mehdi, Shamkhal of Tarki, came to Fatali's rescue and forced Umma Khan to retreat to Karabakh.

== End of reign ==
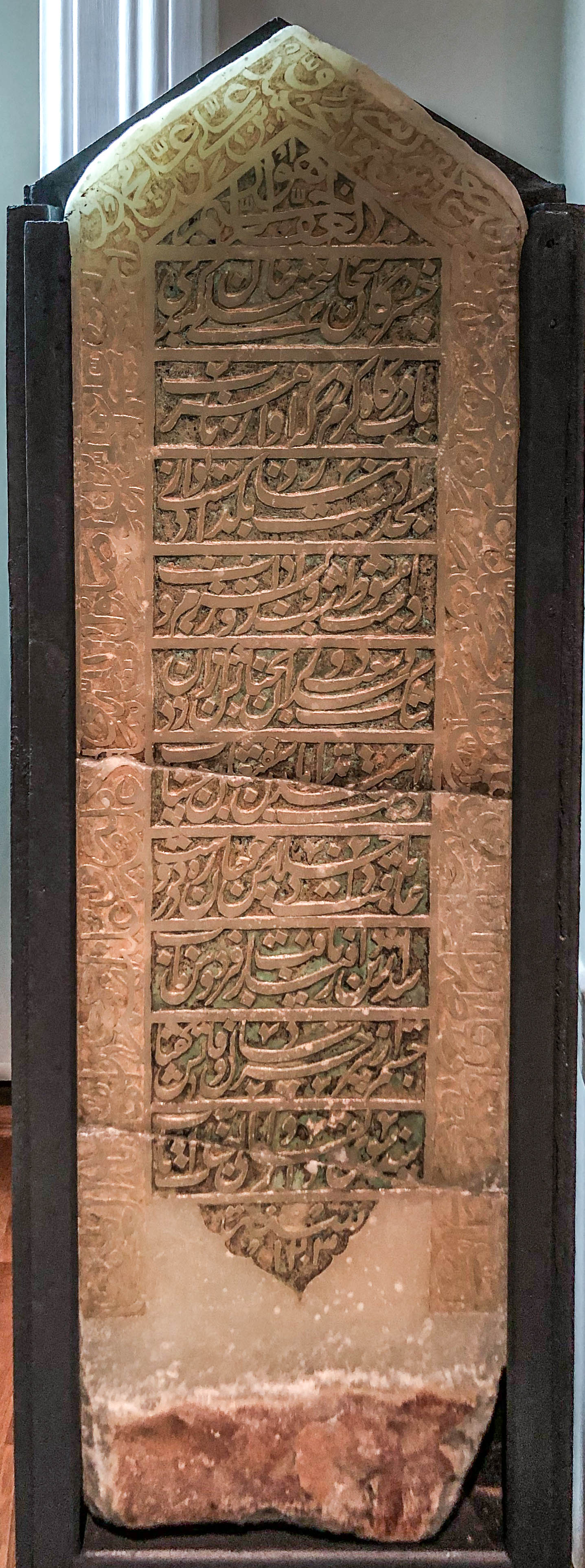
Gravestone of Fatali Khan. Displayed in Museum of History of Azerbaijan.

In March 1787, Fatali Khan signed an agreement with Heraclius II of Kartli-Kakheti, which established a balance in the South Caucasus and strengthened Russia's position in the region. According to Isgandar bey Hajinsky, Fatali's goal for this agreement was to secure peace to his west and prepare for the conquest of Tabriz Khanate.

During the negotiations, Prince Georgi Tsitsishvili and Gurgen bek Enikolopashvili were Georgian ambassadors to Quba, while Mirza Rahim, Fatali's envoy Haji, was sent to Tiflis. This arrangement made it possible for Heraclius not only to strengthen his rear but also to have an ally in the fight against the Karabakh Khan, who dominated Ganja Khanate. In December 1788, Heraclius, now allied with Fatali and his vassal Muhammad Hasan Khan, was able to capture the outskirts of Ganja. In early 1789, Georgian troops led by the son of Heraclius, Prince Vakhtang, defeated Javad Khan.

Fatali Khan and Muhammad Hasan Khan met with King Heraclius in January 1789, inside the Ganja Khanate, on the left bank of the Shamkhor River. Javad Khan also took part in this meeting. The allies worked out a plan of coordinated actions against Karabakh Khanate and divided the spheres of influence: Heraclius took the entire South Caucasus, while Fatali was to control Iranian Azerbaijan. Heraclius II and Fatali agreed to actively fight against the newly rising threat of Agha Muhammad Khan Qajar and "act ... under the auspices of Russia," according to contemporary historian Abbasqulu Bakikhanov. Heraclius decided to return the Shamshadil to the Ganja at the request of Fatali. Immediately after the meeting, Fatali Khan fell ill, left for Baku to stay with his sister, and died there on 2 April [O.S. 22 March] 1789.

On 30 May, General Tekeli reported to Potemkin that associates of the Khan concealed his death to secure his succession.

== Personality ==
Fatali Khan was a Shia Muslim. According to Samuel Gottlieb Gmelin, who visited him in his palace in Derbent, Fatali was well-regarded and did not hesitate to drink or use a hookah. Some of his followers even believed that he was practically an atheist. According to Isgander bey Hajinsky, he was also a bit promiscuous. He knew Russian, Persian and Azerbaijani languages, as well as various languages of Dagestan. Some samples of his poetic work have been preserved.

Fatali was buried in Baku, in a cemetery of Bibi-Heybat Mosque. At present, his gravestone is kept in the Azerbaijan State Museum of History.

== Family ==
According to Gmelin, Fatali Khan had six wives. However, it appears that only three of them were principal ones:

1. Tuti Bike (m. 1764, d. 1787) — his cousin and the sister of Amir Hamza, Utsmi of Kaitags
  - Ahmad Khan (1769–1790) — Khan of Quba (1789–1790), married Kichik Bike, daughter of shamkhal Bammat II in 1787
  - Khanbika khanum (1777–1806) — married Mirza Muhammad Khan II of Baku in 1800
2. Elisu Bike or Gulpari (m. 1774, d. 1814) — daughter of an Elisu Sultan, possibly Khanbaba (1762–1803)
  - Pari Jahan Khanum (b. 1775) — betrothed to Umma Khan in 1786, married to Mehdi, Shamkhal of Tarki in 1796
  - Hasan Khan (1784–1803) — Khan of Quba (1796–1797), Khan of Derbent (1799–1803); married to Nur Jahan Khanum (d. 1814) in 1800.
3. Sahar Nas (m. 1776) — an Armenian, sister of a certain Harutyun of Zeykhur
  - Shaykh Ali Khan (1778–1822) — Khan of Quba (1790–1796; 1797–1806), Khan of Derbent (1790–1796; 1797–1799; 1803–1806)
4. Unknown wife or concubine
  - Chimnaz Khanum – m. 1796 to Abdulla bek, Ghazi of Tabasaran

== Legacy ==
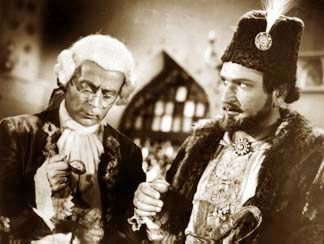
A scene from the film "Fatali Khan". Fatali Khan (Alasgar Alakbarov, right) talking to the Russian ambassador

- Fatali Khan is remembered for giving refuge to Mountain Jews fleeing from the persecution of Gazikumukh Khanate, founding the village of Red Town, still the only shtetl remaining in the world.
- Agha Mesih Shirvani (d. 1766), a poet, dedicated his now lost "Shahnameh" to Fatali Khan.
- An Azerbaijani song dedicated to Fatali Khan was published as a musical record in a magazine published in 1816–1818, in Astrakhan.
- In 1947 a film called "Fatali Khan", dedicated to the life of the Khan of Quba, was shot by film director Efim Dzigan in a Baku film studio. Fatali Khan was portrayed by Alasgar Alakbarov.
- A monument to Fatali Khan was erected on 3 January 1991, on the orders of the Council of Ministers of the Azerbaijan SSR.
- One of the central streets of Quba is named after Fatali Khan.

== Sources ==
- Abdullayev, Gasi (1958). Из истории Северо-Восточного Азербайджана в 60-80-х гг. XVIII в. [From the history of North-East Azerbaijan in the 60-80s of the 18th century] (in Russian). Baku: Publishing House of the Academy of Sciences of Azerbaijan SSR.
- Babayev, Elgun (2003). Из истории Гянджинского ханства [From the history of the Ganja Khanate] (PDF) (in Russian). Baku: Nurlan.
- Bournoutian, George (2021). From the Kur to the Aras: A Military History of Russia's Move into the South Caucasus and the First Russo-Iranian War, 1801–1813. Brill. ISBN 978-9004445154.
- Hajiev, Vladlen (1967). Danialov, Hajiali (ed.). История Дагестана [History of Dagestan] (PDF) (in Russian). Vol. 1. Moscow: Nauka.
- Hajiev, Vladlen (1965). Danialov, Hajiali (ed.). Роль России в истории Дагестана [Role of Russia in History of Dagestan] (PDF) (in Russian). Moscow: Nauka.
- Leviatov, Vadim (1948). Очерки из истории Азербайджана в XVIII веке [Essays from the history of Azerbaijan in the 18th century] (PDF) (in Russian). Baku: Publishing House of the Academy of Sciences of Azerbaijan SSR.
- Markova, Olga (1966). Россия, Закавказье и международные отношения в XVIII веке [Russia, Transcaucasia and international relations in the 18th century] (in Russian). Moscow: Nauka.
- Piotrovsky, Boris (1988). История народов Северного Кавказа с древнейших времен до конца XVIII в. [History of the peoples of the North Caucasus from ancient times to the end of the 18th century.] (in Russian). Nauka. ISBN 9785020094864.
- Ramazanov, Kh.; Shikhsaidov, Amri (1964). Очерки истории Южного Дагестана [Essays on the history of Southern Dagestan] (in Russian). Dagestan branch of the USSR Academy of Sciences.
- Sumbatzade, Alisohbat (1990). Азербайджанцы, этногенез и формирование народа [Azerbaijanis, ethnogenesis and formation of the people] (in Russian). Baku: Elm. ISBN 9785806601774.
- Huseynov, Isa (1958). История Азербайджана [History of Azerbaijan] (in Russian). Publishing House of the Academy of Sciences of the Azerbaijan SSR.
