= Behrud =

- Municipality
- Location within Azerbaijan
- Coordinates: 39°04′29″N 45°51′50″E
- Country: Azerbaijan
- Autonomous republic: Nakhchivan
- District: Ordubad

Population (2005)
  - Total: 520
- Time zone: UTC+4 (AZT)

Behrud (also, Bahrud, Beyyurd and Begyurd) is a village and municipality in the Ordubad District of Nakhchivan, Azerbaijan. It is located in the near of the Ordubad-Bist highway, 36 km in the north-west from the district center, on the left bank of the Gilanchay River. Its population is busy with gardening, farming, animal husbandry. There are secondary school, library, club and a medical center in the village. It has a population of 520.

== Behrud Bridge ==
It was located on trade routes and prospered in Middle Ages. Behrud bridge is an ancient monument near the village. It was built over the Gilanchay River. It has three spans. The length is 10 paronometrs. It is assumed that it was built in the end of the 17th century. In 1996, the bridge was rebuilt and were restored relations between the villages of Paraga-Tivi-Nasirvaz of Ordubad District.
