= Haşımxanlı =

- Municipality
- Location within Azerbaijan
- Coordinates: 40°02′42″N 48°39′39″E
- Country: Azerbaijan
- Rayon: Sabirabad

Population
  - Total: 2,200
- Time zone: UTC+4 (AZT)
  - Summer (DST): UTC+5 (AZT)

Haşımxanlı (also, Gashimkhanly) is a village and municipality in the Sabirabad Rayon of Azerbaijan. It has a population of 2,200.
