= Kotavan =

- Municipality
- Location within Azerbaijan
- Coordinates: 40°22′31″N 47°25′52″E
- Country: Azerbaijan
- Rayon: Agdash

Population
  - Total: 938
- Time zone: UTC+4 (AZT)
  - Summer (DST): UTC+5 (AZT)

Kotavan (also, Ketavan and Komavan) is a village and municipality in the Agdash Rayon of Azerbaijan. It has a population of 938.
