= Goychay (river) =

River in Azerbaijan

- Native name: Göyçay (Azerbaijani)

Location
- Country: Azerbaijan

Physical characteristics
- Source: Greater Caucasus
  - coordinates: 40.5936°N 48.1401°E
- Mouth: Karasu → Kura → Caspian Sea
- Length: 113 km (70 mi)
- Basin size: 1,770 km^{2} (680 sq mi)

Goychay is a river in Azerbaijan, which flows through the Gabala, Ismayilli, Goychay and Ujar districts. The length of the river is 113 km. The area of the drainage basin is 1770 km^{2}. The average water flow near the city of Goychay is 12.9 m^{3}/s.

It originates at the foot of Mount Babadagh. In the area of the city Goychay, it is divided into numerous branches and canals and is widely used for irrigation.

Merging with the waters of the Turyanchay spillway, it forms Karasu, the left tributary of Kura. The main tributaries are Ayrichay, Vandamchay, Karachay (Damiraparanchay branch) and others.
