= Hajji Mohammad Ali Khan =

Khan of Shirvan

Khan of Shirvan
- Reign: 1747–1763
- Predecessor: Title last claimed by Surkhai I
- Successor: Muhammad Said Khan
- Born: 1683; Zarnava, Shirvan, Safavid Empire
- Died: c. 1763 (aged 79–80); Shamakhi, Shirvan Khanate
- Father: Sofi Nabi
- Religion: Shia Islam

Hajji Mohammad Ali Khan (Persian: حاجی محمد علی زرناوه‌ای, romanized: Ḥājjī Muḥammad ʿAlī Zarnāvāʾī) was the first khan (governor) of the Shirvan Khanate, ruling from c. 1747 to 1761 or 1763.

== Life ==
According to Pyotr Butkov, he was born c. 1683. His father's name was recorded as Sofi Nabi by Mirza Hasan Alkadari and Abbasgulu agha Bakikhanov. His epithet Zarnava'i suggests he was born in Zarnava (currently in Ismayilli district, inhabited by Tats). Butkov suggest that Hajji Mohammad has already established his power base by 1734 thanks to an appointment by Nader Shah following his Dagestan Campaign while Bakikhanov mentions him as a "receiver of supplies". Following Nader's murder in 1747, Hajji Mohammad became ruler of settled population of Shirvan. Samuel Gmelin attributes to an appointment by either Adel Shah or Ebrahim Shah in c. 1748.

According to Bakikhanov, he was soon besieged in 1755 in his capital New Shamakhi by Hajji Chalabi of Shaki Khanate, who claimed to be ruler of Shirvan. Hajji Mohammad in his turn appealed to Husayn Ali Khan of Quba Khanate for support. The latter arrived with 3,000 strong army, supported by Amir Hamza, Utsmi of Kaitags who came with 500 men. Allies won the battle against Shaki forces despite being outnumbered.

According to Bakikhanov, after getting khan title from Zand ruler Karim Khan Zand (r. 1751–1779), Muhammad Said Khan and Aghasi Khan invaded New Shamakhi and killed Hajji Mohammad "who loved the glory and wants to live in peace" in 1765. Both Gmelin and Butkov, however, report that only Muhammad Said got the title of khanship and was invited by people of New Shamakhi who were displeased by Hajji due to his drunkenness and many vanities in 1761. Although, according to them, he wasn't killed but taken prisoner and sent to Old Shamakhi where he died next year at the age of 80.

The Russian consul in Anzali, Ilia Igumnov, however provided a very different account. In his report to the College of Foreign Affairs of 30 March 1764, Igumnov noted that Hajji Mohammad Ali hosted Azad Khan Afghan who was on the run from Karim Khan Zand at the time. Hajji Mohammad reportedly "not only received them with joy, but also gave them better places for settlement and assigned each a satisfactory pension". Azad Khan and his courtiers began to offend the dignity of Shamakhi locals, to harass them, to make advances on their daughters, and to take other men's wives by force. "Mohammad Ali Khan dismissed the complaints of Shamakhi denizens, did not listen to them — the latter finally rose up and overthrew him from power," according to Igumnov's report. Based on this reading, Sarkar brothers used the opportunity to side with Zands and take the power in their hands. Igumnov puts year of Hajji Mohammad's arrest in 1763, saying he died within five weeks in Old Shamakhi, probably because of being poisoned.

His son Manaf Zarnava'i would later surface to claim Shirvan khanate.

== Sources ==
- Bakikhanov, Abbasgulu (2009). The Heavenly Rose-garden: A History of Shirvan & Daghestan. Mage Publishers. ISBN 978-1-933823-27-0.
- Bournoutian, George (2021). From the Kur to the Aras: A Military History of Russia's Move into the South Caucasus and the First Russo-Iranian War, 1801–1813. Brill. ISBN 978-9004445154.
- Butkov, Pyotr (1869). Материалы для новой истории Кавказа, с 1722 по 1803 год [Materials for the new history of the Caucasus, from 1722 to 1803] (in Russian). Vol. 1. Saint Petersburg: Saint Petersburg Academy of Sciences.
