= Adolf Berzhe =

Russian Orientalist (1828–1886)

- Адольф Берже
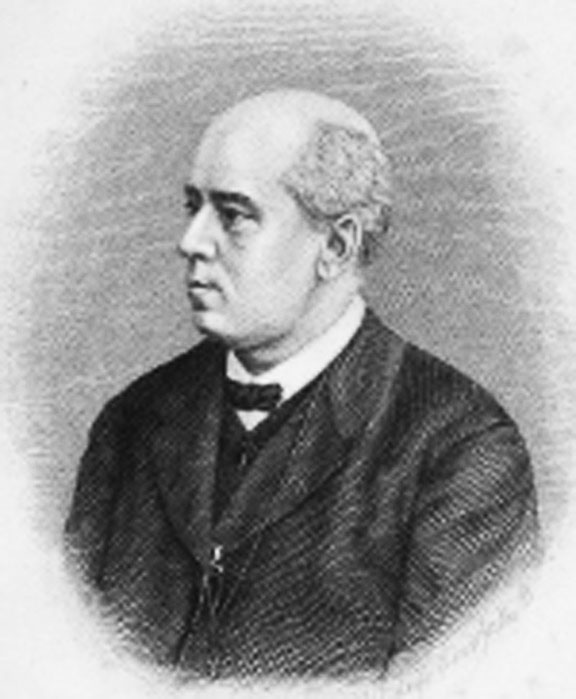
- Portrait, 1886.
- Pronunciation: Russian pronunciation: [ɐdəlʲf bʲɪrˈʐɛ]
- Born: 9 August 1828 (Note: O.S. 28 July.); Saint Petersburg, Russian Empire
- Died: 12 February 1886 (aged 57) (Note: O.S. 31 January.); Tiflis, Russian Empire
- Education: Eastern Faculty of St. Petersburg State University
- Known for: Chairman of the Caucasian Archaeographical Commission, Compiler of Acts of the Caucasian Archaeographic Commission
- Father: Peter Berzhé
- Scientific career
- Fields: History, oriental studies, caucasology, archaeography

Adolf Pyetrovich Berzhe (also spelled Bergé; Russian: Адо́льф Петро́вич Берже́, IPA: [ɐdəlʲf pʲɪtrəvʲɪd͡ʑ bʲɪrˈʐɛ]; (Note: Pre-reform orthography: Адольфъ Петровичъ Берже.) 9 August [O.S. 28 July] 1828 – 12 February [O.S. 31 January] 1886) was a Russian bureaucrat and Orientalist historian, with principal interests in the history and culture of the South Caucasus. He was also an archaeographer and archaeologist, and served as the chairman of the Caucasian branch of the Archaeographical Commission from 1864 to 1886.

A Saint Petersburg native, Berzhe's father was from France and his mother was from Germany. Trained in Oriental studies at Saint Petersburg University, Berzhe's was dispatched to the chancellery of the Viceroy of the Caucasus Prince Mikhail Vorontsov in 1851. He made two scholarly trips to Persia in 1853 and 1855. From 1864 to his death Berzhe's chaired the Tiflis-based Caucasian Archaeographical Commission. He died at Tiflis in 1886, leaving behind a number of works pertaining to the history of the Caucasus and Middle East, including the monumental 11-volume collection of archival documents titled Akty, sobrannye Kavkazskoy arkheograficheskoy komissiyey (Documents collected by the Caucasian Archaeographical Commission, Tiflis, 1866–1886), the last volume of which appeared in print after Berzhe's death.

== Background ==
Berzhe was born in Saint Petersburg, Russian Empire, on 9 August [O.S. 28 July] 1828 in the family of a French nobleman who had immigrated to Russia. His mother was a German from Mecklenburg. He studied in a private boarding school, then at a Reformed school and the Gatchina Orphan Institute. From 1847 to 1851, Berzhe studied at the Educational Department of Oriental Languages at the Asian Department of the Ministry of Foreign Affairs (later the Oriental Department of the Historical and Philological Faculty of St. Petersburg University), from which he graduated as a candidate of the university. He acquired in his studies an excellent knowledge of the Arabic, Persian, and Turkish languages, the history and geography of the Orient, and Russian history.

== Civil service ==
After graduating from university, Berzhe entered the chancery of the Caucasus Viceroyalty, governed then by Mikhail Vorontsov. In 1852, Berzhe accompanied the expedition of Aleksandr Meyendorff, the materials of which were used for his work Prikaspiysky kray (The Caspian region). In 1853–1855, Berzhe visited Qajar Iran twice as a diplomat and was tasked with preventing a rapprochement between Iran and Ottoman Empire during the Crimean War. In Iran, he visited the cities of Tabriz, Qazvin, Tehran, Isfahan, Shiraz and others. Berzhe further improved his knowledge of the Persian language, became acquainted with Iranian scholars, acquired rare books and manuscripts, wrote travel notes, and collected materials for stories that could have interested Russian readers. During this time, Berzhe also published his first works.

On 5 November [O.S. 24 October] 1854, Mikhail Vorontsov, who was known as a patron of trade, industry and education in the Caucasus, resigned and Nikolay Muravyov replaced him as the viceroy of Caucasus. The young Berzhe was unhappy with this change, as can attested by his memoirs. Muravyov tasked Berzhe with the compilation of a dictionary that would allow about 1,500 the most commonly used Russian words to be pronounced in any Caucasian language. However, the implementation of this plan was not carried out, and its inconsistency was noted by the famous linguist Pyotr Uslar and Berzhe himself from the very beginning.

In 1855, on behalf of Nikolay Muravyov, Berzhe again visited Iran. While there, he wrote a correspondence to the newspaper Kavkaz containing information about the recent events in Iran like the Persian campaign in Khiva or the Babid uprising in Zanjan in 1850–1852. During his visit in Iran, Berzhe published his Russian translation of the work of Azerbaijani historian Mirza Jamal Javanshir, Tarikh-e Qarabagh. Berzhe's most important archaeographic discovery was the library of Kalust Shirmazanian, a wealthy Armenian merchant who had moved from Persia to Russia in 1821. At the time of Berzhe's arrival, the library was owned by Shirzamanian's son. In addition to 193 old Armenian and Persian books, some of which were unknown to Russian orientalists, Berzhe also discovered about 600 firmans of Persian shahs. The information collected in Persia served as material for Berzhe's article "On national holidays, fasts and significant days among Shiite Muslims in general and among Persians in particular," published in 1855 in the almanac Kavkazskiy kalendar, the editor of which Berzhe became in 1856.

== Career ==
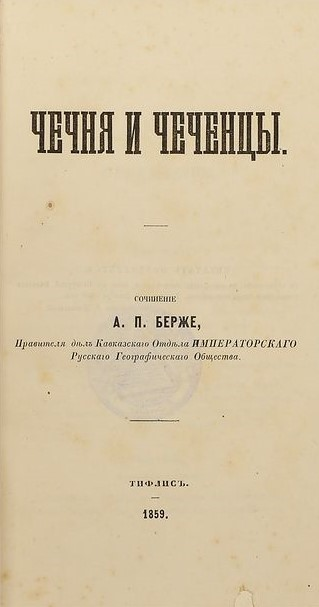
Front page of Berzhe's monograph Chechnya and the Chechens, republished in Tiflis in 1859. First edition published in Kavkazskiy kalendar in 1858.

In Kavkazskiy kalendar, Berzhe began publishing his works about the peoples of Dagestan and Chechnya. These works, which were describing recent events, contained a large amount of raw historical data. This was later recognized by Berzhe's himself, who in 1879 critically reviewed his work Chechnya i chechentsy (Chechnya and the Chechens), noting that, as "the first experience of this kind, this work is not without great shortcomings".

In 1857, Berzhe was appointed the head of the Tiflis Public Library. In 1861 he published the library's catalogue.

In 1858, Berzhe visited Dagestan in search of the rumored Utsmi chest, a chest containing ancient manuscripts which once belonged to an utsmi of Kaitag. With the help of the local administration and especially Dagestani scholars, notably Imam Shamil's former philosophy teacher Bin Khitinou Lachinilou, the chest was found. There was a rich collection of manuscripts in the chest that was later transferred to the Imperial Russian Academy of Sciences. It included a manuscript of The History of the Three Imams (a.k.a. The Shining of Dagestani Swords) by Muhammad Tahir al-Qarakhi, a history of the Caucasian War from the Caucasian perspective. Berzhe also found a magnificent handwritten ancient copy of the Quran in one of the mosques of Khunzakh. It contained the genealogy of the Avar khans in its postscript that was published by Berzhe in one of the volumes of the Acts of the Caucasian Archaeographic Commission. In addition, in Temir-Khan-Shura, Prince Dzhoradze gifted Berzhe the manuscript Chronicle of Dagestan. Berzhe's visit to Dagestan was unusually fruitful and it was covered in the first issues of the newspaper Kavkaz for 1862.

Berzhe also discovered the autograph of the famous Kabardian author Shora Nogmov History of the Adyghe people. Berzhe wrote a preface to this work with the help of Kabardian intellectuals who personally knew Nogmov. He published the work in the Kavkazskiy kalendar in 1861 and the German translation of the work in Leipzig in 1866. Publication of Nogmov's work was met positively by Pyotr Uslar, and later by Soviet historians and philologists like Georgy Kokiev, Tugan Kumykov, Georgy Turchaninov, Ilya Treskov and Hasan Turkaev.

Together with academic Marie-Félicité Brosset, the famous Georgian poet Raphael Eristavi, historian Dimitri Bakradze, local historians S. Amirejibi and Gulbani, Berzhe searched for gujari ('deeds of gift') of Georgian monasteries, the texts of which were preserved in copies of Berzhe for Brosset.

For many years, in collaboration with local scientists, Berzhe collected samples of Azerbaijani poetry of the 18th–19th centuries that he wanted to publish in Russia. He collected the works and biographies of many Azerbaijani poets (Note: Akhund Molla Penakh, Molla Panah Vagif, Gasim bey Zakir, Mesikh, Kenberg, Karbalai, Abdullah Jami, Baba Bek, Mehdi Bek, Ashiq Peri, Molla Vali Vidadi, Kazim agha Salik, Arif Nasir, Abdur-Rahman Shapr, Nebati Ajaf and Masum.) in Iran which he compiled in his manuscript. He wrote a letter to academician Pyotr Kyoppen on 30 January [O.S. 18 January] 1860 requesting his manuscript be published, but it was published only in 1869–1870 by the Leipzig publisher Zenker with a preface written by Berzhe in German. The work was never published in Russia despite several attempts.

On 23 March [O.S. 11 March] 1860 Berzhe was appointed the chairman of the Caucasian Archaeographical Commission. After the appointment, Berzhe visited Europe as part of his four-month business trip. The purpose of the trip was to publish the collection of Azerbaijani poetry and a Persian-French dictionary intended for those involved in the translation of Persian official documents. In recognition of his scholarly achievements, Berzhe was elected a member of the Société Asiatique and the Société Orientale de France in Paris and a member of the Deutsche Morgenländische Gesellschaft in Leipzig. Returning to Tiflis, Berzhe began compiling documents for future publications of the Caucasian Archaeographic Commission.

== Sources ==
- "Берже, Адольф Петрович" [Berzhe, Adolf Pyetrovich]. Brockhaus and Efron Encyclopedic Dictionary. 1891 – via Wikisource.
- Georgiev, Vladimir (25 October 2023). "ВОРОНЦО́В МИХАИЛ СЕМЁНОВИЧ" [VORONTSÓV MIKHAIL SEMYONOVICH]. Great Russian Encyclopedia (in Russian).
- Kolosov, L. N. (1987). "А. П. Берже: Материалы к научной биографии" [A. P. Berge: Materials for a scientific biography]. In Nechkina, Militsa (ed.). История и историки: Историографический ежегодник. 1982—1983 гг. [History and historians: Historiographic Yearbook. 1982–1983] (PDF) (in Russian). Moscow: Nauka. pp. 213–224.
- Mukhanov, Vadim. "БЕРЖЕ́ АДОЛЬФ ПЕТРОВИЧ" [BERZHÉ ADOLF PYETROVICH]. Great Russian Encyclopedia (in Russian).
