= Gulistan-i Iram =

1841 chronicle by Abbasgulu Bakikhanov

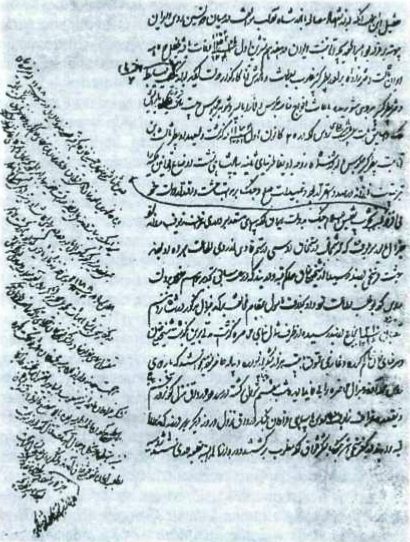
- Folio of a manuscript of the Gulistan-i Iram
- Author: Abbasgulu Bakikhanov
- Language: Persian
- Genre: History
- Publication date: 1841
- Publication place: Russian Empire

The Gulistan-i Iram (Note: Also transliterated as Golestan-e Eram.) (Persian: گلستان ارم, romanized: The Heavenly Rose-Garden) is a 19th-century Persian-language chronicle on the history of Shirvan, Dagestan, and Derbent from ancient times until the Treaty of Golestan concluded between the Russian Empire and Qajar Iran in 1813. It was composed in 1841 by Abbasgulu Bakikhanov, a 19th-century Azerbaijani polymath who served under the Russian Empire. The name of the book is an allusion to the Garden of Iram mentioned in the Quran and the Gulistan village, where the treaty was concluded.

Bakikhanov applied the methods he learned from Nikolay Karamzin and other contemporary European historians to Persian and Arabic history when writing the book. His attitude, however, was more innovative and analytical. He altered these methods through his knowledge of Persian genres and Islamic historical traditions, supplementing them with European standards, methods, and ideals. Bakikhanov's fusion of poetry and history is characterized by a number of unique elements, including its utilization of a hilly landscape to inspire awe. Here, Bakikhanov expands on the Arabic and Persian aja'ib ("miracles") genre.

The book draws heavily from major Persian histories to explain the beginnings of human history, the most notable of which are the History of the Prophets and Kings of al-Tabari (died 923), the Tarikh-i guzida ("Excerpt History") and Zafarnamah ("Book of Victory") of Hamdallah Mustawfi (died after 1339/40), the Rawzat as-safa ("Garden of Purity") of Mirkhvand (died 1498), as well as its shortened version, the Khulasat al-akhbar ("Compendium of Reports") by Khvandamir (died 1535/6).

A 1984 Russian edition of the work was published by the Azerbaijani historian Ziya Bunyadov, which has been called "incomplete and defective." Around 20 pages, chapters 63, 64, 65 and 66 of which focuses mostly on Armenia and the Armenians, have been removed.

== Sources ==
- Bockholt, Philip (2020). "Khvāndamīr". In Fleet, Kate; Krämer, Gudrun; Matringe, Denis; Nawas, John; Rowson, Everett (eds.). Encyclopaedia of Islam (3rd ed.). Brill Online. ISSN 1873-9830.
- Bournoutian, George A. (2004). Two Chronicles on the History of Karabagh (Mirza Jamal Javanshir's "Tarikh-e Qarabaq" and Mirza Adigozal Beg's "Qarabaq Nameh."). Costa Mesa, California: Mazda Publishers. ISBN 1-56859-179-9.
- Bournoutian, George A. (2018). Armenia and Imperial Decline: The Yerevan Province, 1900–1914. Milton Park, Abingdon, Oxon: Routledge. ISBN 978-1-351-06260-2. OCLC 1037283914.
- Floor, Willem M.; Javadi, Hasan (2009). The heavenly rose-garden: a history of Shirvan & Daghestan, by Abbas Qoli Aqa Bakikhanov. Mage Publishers. ISBN 978-1933823270.
- Gould, Rebecca Ruth (2019). "The Persianate Cosmology of Historical Inquiry in the Caucasus: ʿAbbās Qulī Āghā Bākīkhānūf's Cosmological Cosmopolitanism". Comparative Literature. Vol. 71, no. 3. Duke University Press. pp. 272–297.
- Javadi, Hasan (2022). "Bakikhanov, Abbas-Kuli-Aga". In Yarshater, Ehsan (ed.). Encyclopædia Iranica (Online ed.). Encyclopædia Iranica Foundation.
- Tsutsiev, Arthur (2014). Atlas of the Ethno-Political History of the Caucasus (PDF). Translated by Nora Seligman Favorov. New Haven: Yale University Press. ISBN 9780300153088. Archived (PDF) from the original on 17 June 2023.
