= Safavid Talish =

Governorate of Safavid Iran (1501–1736)

Talish
- 1501–1736
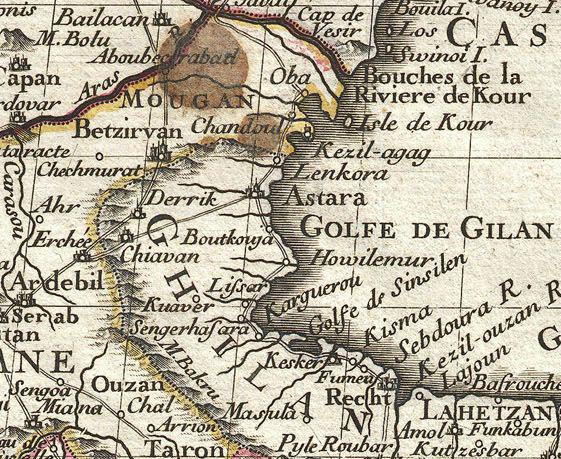
- A 1724 map created by Guillaume Delisle
- Status: Region of the Safavid Iran; Under Russian occupation (1723–1732)
- Capital: Astara
- Historical era: Early modern period
  - Established: 1501
  - Disestablished: 1736
Preceded by	Succeeded by
Realm of Ispahbad	Talish Khanate
- Today part of: Iran; Azerbaijan

The region of Talish was a governorate of Safavid Iran (1501–1736), located in the greater Talish, presently divided between Iran and Azerbaijan. The territory of the governorate was principally made up of the two subordinate governorates of Astara and Lankaran. The city of Astara was its administrative center, the base of Safavid power in the region.

== Historiography ==
=== Primary sources ===
There is little information about the History of Talish in the early modern period. In contrast to other regions of the Persianate world, no Talish-based chronicles were written during the Safavid era. Two Persian chronicles were written after northern Talish became a Russian province. The first is the Akhbār Nāmeh (1882) (i.e., The Chronicle), written by Mirza Ahmad ibn Mirza Khodāverdi. Another local chronicle is Javāher Nāmeh-ye Lankarān (1869) (i.e., The Jewel Book of Lankaran), written by Saeid-Ali ibn Kazem Beg Borādigāhi (1800–1872). Another primary source that may be added to the chronicle-type sources is the Russian survey entitled Istoriia Talyshskogo khanstva (1885) (i.e., The History of the Talish Khanate) written by Teymur Bayramalibeyov (1863–1937). Two other group of primary sources are documentary material, and travel accounts.

== Administration ==
It is known that in the Safavid administrative division, the ulkas (i.e., country) were governed by a tribal leader, who was subordinate to the beylerbeys, but was either appointed by a shah's decree or given to any congregation, whose authority was still confirmed by the shah. In both cases, ruler of "ulka" was called hākem (i.e., governor).

During the travel of Adam Olearius (1599–1671), ambassador of Frederick III, Duke of Holstein-Gottorp to Persia, the governor of Astara was Saru Khan and the center was the city of Astara. He also showed that the rule of Qurchi-bashi in Lankaran and Huseyn Sultan's rule in Qizilaghaj (Persian: قزل‌آغاج).

There are contradictory opinions in the historical literature and sources about the management and administrative division of the region at the end of the 17th and the beginning of the 18th centuries. Some of them shows that the region consisted of two administrative-territorial units, but others shows that it consisted of three units. Vidadi Muradov (born 1956) believes that the occurrence of this contradictory information was connected with the complex political situation existing in the region. The battles for power here led to frequent changes in the boundaries of territorial units and their rulers, and thus, to the emergence of contradictory information.

A decree issued during the reign of Shah Sultan Husayn (r. 1694–1722) states that in the Rajab 1115 AH (November 1703) the whole of Mughan, together with the city of Lankaran, was ruled by a ruler named Abbas-Qoli Khan. In Astara, Musa Khan was the ruler. In one part of a document translated by Vladimir Puturidze (1893–1966), Abbas-Qoli Khan is shown as the ruler of Mughan, and in the other part as the ruler of Lankaran and other territories.

The Scottish traveler John Bell (1691–1780) visited Astara, Qizilaghaj and Lankaran From 12 December 1717 to June 1718 and mentioned the names of these places in his book. The Russuan envoy to Persia, Artemy Volynsky (1689–1740) visited the region in 1717–1718. He mentioned Astara, Lankaran and Qizilaghaj, and said that a Khan ruling in Astara and a Sultan ruling in Qizilaghaj. The Russian lieutenant Fedor Ivanovich Soimonov (1692–1780) and the Dutch cartographer Carl Van Verden (died 1731) whom set out in May 1720 to explore the Caspian Sea, wrote at the mouth of the Astara River that they had been greeted with great kindness and friendliness by the ruler of Astara, however they didn't mention the name of him. The historian Ilya Pavlovich Petrushevsky (1889–1977), based on Tazkirat al-Mulūk (c. 1725), mentioned only two districts of Astara and Qaraaghaj. Astara, Ujarud (Note: not exactly, but approximately consisted of present-day Parsabad, Bileh Savar and Germy counties and some parts of Bilasuvar District) (Persian: اُجارود), Mughan and Qaraaghaj (Note: probably mistaken because of confusing similarity with Qizilaghaj) (Persian: قره‌آغاج) are mentioned in the list of local governors in Tazkirat al-Mulūk.

The Russian historian, Pyotr Grigorievich Butkov (1775–1857) indicated that Talish was governed by two rulers in the 1720s. He stated that the ruler named "Omir Agis" (Note: originally "Mir Aziz") ruled Lankaran, and Musa Khan ruled Qizilaghaj. Mammadova took into account that in the Russian historical documents, the ruler of the Qizilaghaj was Bijan Sultan and Musa Khan was mentioned as ruler of Astara but Butkov shows him as the ruler of Qizilaghaj. She believed that Butkov's information is incorrect.

According to above information, in 1720s, Lankaran and Mughan were managed by Mir Abbas Khan, Astara was ruled by Musa Khan and Qizilaghaj was administered by Bijan Sultan. In the Mirza Ahmad's book, Musa Khan is mentioned as the ruler of Astara (Note: consisted of present-day Astara County and Astara District) consisting of Karganrud, Asalem, Vilkij, (Note: Not be confused with Vilkij District of the Namin County, which is the namesake of the historical greater Vilkij) Drigh (Note: not exactly, but approximately present-day Yardymli District) and Zuvand districts.

== History ==
=== 16th century ===
Caucasus 1532 map

The Safavids' kinship with the ruling dynasty of the Talish had a serious impact on its socio-political life for several centuries. Apparently, this kinship was the reason that young Ismail Safavi (r. 1501–1524) spent the winter of 1500 in the Archivan village of Astara. This played a major role in increasing the number of Safavid supporters. It might be assumed that the kinship with the Safavids was more advantageous for the Talish rulers. They became much stronger by relying on this kinship; even though they rebelled against the Safavids in the 1540s and 1590s, they were able to maintain their power.

The leading figures of Talish were among the seven companions of Ismail in 1500's exodus from Gilan. The inherited rulers of Talish became active participants in the political processes at the second half of the 15th century and at the beginning of the 16th century. They assisted Safavids in the fight against the Aq Qoyunlu Confederation and Shirvanshahs' state. Highly praising their help, the Safavid rulers, included the Talishis in the ranks of the Qizilbash tribes. The presence of Talish chiefs in secondary posts affirms the relative importance of these figures in the Qizilbash. For example, At Baghdad's 1508 conquest, a Talishi was made governor of the city and all of Arabian Iraq. Also another Talishi chief was governor of Astarabad.

Haydar (1554–1576) was a son of the Shah Tahmasp I (r. 1514–1576). The succession of Haydar, after his father's death, was supported by a complex coalition which consisted of some Talish elements at the royal court. This coalition was opposed by a similarly complex groups. In short order, this latter group captured and killed Haydar and freed his older half-brother Ismail II (r. 1576–1577). Aftermore, Enthronement of Abbas I (r. 1587–1629) in Qazvin was supported by Talishis from Astara.

According to the document which related to Babagil tomb, Bayandor Khan was the incumbent governor of Astara region in 1551. Bayandor Khan was the great ruler of Astara region for a long time during the reigns of Tahmasp I (r. 1524–1576), Ismail II (r. 1576–1577) and Mohammad Khodabanda (r. 1578–1587) and lived in Astara. During the Ottoman–Safavid War, Amir Hamzeh Khan rebelled against his father, Bayandor Khan, and took control of the Astara region.

In 1590–91, Zu'l-Fiqar Khan Qaramanlu, who was appointed as the governor of Ardabil, nominated his brother Alvand Sultan as the ruler of Lankaran. Upon learning of Alvand's appointment as governor of Lankaran, Hamzeh Khan Talish tried to prevent him from taking up his post and spoke out against government troops. However, he was defeated and resisted in the Shindan Castle in the Talish Mountains. this event took place in 1000 AH (October 1591 – October 1592). The castle was besieged for months, the resistance broken and Hamzeh Khan exiled to Ottoman-occupied Shirvan. Hamzeh Khan stayed in Shirvan and was killed there by the Shah's secret agents. Two years after the revolt of Amir Hamzeh, out of compassion for his sons, Bayandor II and Saru, Shah Abbas granted the rule of Astara to Bayandor II and after him, granted the hereditary territory to Saru Khan. Finally, Alvand Sultan Qaramanlu was installed, with the help of Safavid officials of Ardabil and the class of the Sheikhavand and Shahsevans.

=== 17th century ===
In 1604, nomads of Talish were ordered to help the Georgian Prince Constantine I of Kakheti to retake the province of Shirvan.

The deceased Hamzeh Khan's sons, Bayandor II and Saru, consistently ruled Talish and were on the list of great emirs. During the great revolt of the peasants against the Shah in Gilan and Talish, Saru Khan was appointed as sepahsālār (commander-in-chief) of the Shah's army. He suppressed the revolt with great cruelty and was therefore highly respected by Shah Safi (r. 1629–1642). In the list of emirs of 1628, Iskandar Beg Munshi (c. 1560 – c. 1632) mentioned two emirs of Talish: Saru Khan as the ruler of Astara; Badr Sultan as the ruler of several Talish districts.

Seyyed Abbas was ordered to Lankaran in Rabi' al-Thani 1064 AH (February 1654) by the decree of Shah Abbas II (r. 1642–1666). The cause of this appointment was his bravery against the Ottomans. Seyyed Abbas was the figure that founded future dynasty of Khans of Lankaran. It is said that he had had a kinship with the Safavid dynasty.

Persia's external borders came under pressure at the end of the 17th century. Turkoman tribesmen were raided the northern borderlands, entering Safavid territory as far as Astara and Farahabad in the Caspian region.

=== 18th century ===
When the Russians captured Rasht in 1722, the ministers (vizier) of Astara and Gaskar campaigned to Rasht. They had gathered the 15,000-strong troops to drive them out the Russians. During the invasion of the Caspian coast provinces in 1723, Mir Abbas Beg ruled in Lankaran and Mughan, Musa Khan in Astara, and Bijan Sultan in Qizilaghaj. After the occupation of Baku in August 1723, Mir Abbas Beg wrote a letter to major-general Mikhail Matyushkin (1676–1737) and declared his allegiance to him.

According to the Treaty of Constantinople in 1724, the Caspian coast provinces from Derbent to Astrabad were to be under Russian protection. However, during the Russian occupation of the Caspian coast provinces in 1722–1735, the Talish rulers maintained their authorities. In 1725, the Ottomans captured Ardabil. In 23 December, Russian major-general Vasily Yakovlevich Levashov (1667–1751) demanded that the Ottomans abide by the terms of the agreement between the two empires and withdraw from Ardabil. However, the Ottoman side not only rejected this demand, but even captured Astara and Karganrud in 1726. (Note: At this time, Safavid governor of Mughan was Ughulu Khan. The Ottomans appointed Safi-Qoli Khan to their sector of Mughan, and the Russians had already entrusted their territories in Salyan and Mughan to the authority of Ali-Qoli Khan Shahsevan.) This caused the Russians to protest.

Ali Pasha of Ardabil explains the occupation of Astara and Karganrud as follows:

These districts were not subordinated to any of the three sides, and many people gathered here from the territories occupied by the Ottomans. They gathered together and attacked the Ottoman troops. The Ottomans took the above-mentioned places to put an end to it.

However, the strict tax policy of the Ottomans soon led to a popular uprising. They demanded 140,000 manats from the people of Astara. The main cause of this uprising, the Astara's Khan, had to seek Russian protection for fear of being punished by the Ottomans. All this created favorable conditions for the capture of Astara and nearby provinces by the Russians. Mir Abbas beg, ruler of Lankaran, asked the Russian commander's office in Baku to send some troops in boats to Sari island without delay and said that Mir Abbas beg would stay on Sari Island until Russian troops captured Lankaran. He wanted weapons and ammunition and said that he had gathered a group of a thousand people. Some times earlier, Mir Abbas Beg's brother, was against the Russians. Mir Aziz Khan began to speak to his brother, citing the example of Musa Khan from Astara under Ottoman protection. Soon, a conflict arose between the two brothers, probably as a result of a certain plot by Musa Khan of Astara. At the same time, the Ottomans captured and killed Mir Abbas Beg. After that, Mir Aziz Khan was afraid and had to seek Russian protection. According to Levashov, in October 1726, Musa Khan was under the protection of the Ottomans and had several Ottoman warriors with him to protect him.

After the Ottomans withdrawal from Astara, in autumn 1726, Musa Khan came to Rasht in order to ask general Vasily Vladimirovich Dolgorukov (1667–1746), commander-in-chief of the Russian forces in Caucasus, protect them from revenge, promising his allegiance to Russia and asking for Russian protection. Instead of the Russians help, he agreed to pay a certain amount to the Tsar's treasury. On 8 December 1726, Musa Khan and his courtiers took an oath of allegiance to Russia. He was the ruler of Astara and Karganrud regions in that time. On 18 March 1727, the Qizilaghaj's Sultan, Bijan, came to Dolgorukov and swore his allegiance to the Russia. By confirm of Dolgorukov, Bijan remained his rule. Bijan's origin was Georgian.

Dolgorukov decided to capture the lands from Gaskar to Salyan. In January, brigadier-general Shternshants, who sent by Dolgorukov, arrived in Astara with 500 troops. Following him, Dolgorukov, along with 300 dragoons, moved Astara. Musa Khan welcomed him with pleasure and promised to build a fortress in Astara by his own expense. Dolgorukov promised him the emperor's patronage, which would be confirmed him as the ruler of Astara province. Instead, Musa Khan promised to pay 50,000 from the income of Astara and Karganrud provinces to the Tsar's treasury. Dolgorukov instructed Shternshants to build a fortress in Astara. Also, he gave the administration of the districts of Astara, Karganrud and Lankaran to Shternshants. On 12 December 1727, a treaty was signed between the Russian and Ottoman empires at the village of Mabur (near Shamakhi). According to the decision of the representatives of the both states, the Russian troops kept a share of Mushkur, Niyazabad, Javad, Salyan, Lankaran, Astara and Qizilaghaj regions and Talish Mountains, but without using weapons.

After capture of Astara, Shternshants headed for Lankaran with his army. Mir Aziz Khan initially had a negative attitude towards to the arrival of Russian forces. Learning the enemy position of the Lankaran's ruler, Shternshants sent his troops there, but Mir Aziz Khan avoided military clashes, except small skirmishes. Finally, Mir Aziz Khan found that they could not resist the Russian troops, so accepted the patronage of the Russian Empire and undertook to pay at least 5,000 manats a year. Shternshants ordered to build a fortress in Astara and in the village of Jil at the Lankaran's countryside. In connection with Dolgorukov's return to Moscow in 1728, the administration of Gilan and Astara was entrusted to Levashov.

According to Levashov, Mustafa Pasha of Ardabil repeatedly tried to persuade Musa Khan to take his side. The Ottomans, with the help of a person called Veysel, and other locals who had attracted to the Ottoman side, inflicted heavy damage on the Russian government of the Caspian coast. In 1728, Veysel carried out a series of guerrilla raids on Astara and other districts. Levashov informed Ivan Neplyuyev (1693–1773), the Tsar's secret envoy to Constantinople, about these events and wrote that he attacked Astara province with 600-700 troops. On 28 August 1730, general Famitsy informed Dolgorukov that Musa Khan had left one of his sons in Rasht and the other in Astara and joined the Mohammad-Qoli Khan, the Ottoman governor of Khalkhal. Jafar Sultan and the ruler of Karganrud, Zarb-Ali Beg, also joined them.

The main reason for his departure was the boundless suspicions of Russian general Famitsy. It seems that the Russian government not only limited the power of the local feudal rulers, but also treated them with suspicion and strict control. Levashov informed the Empress Anna (r. 1730–1740) that Musa Khan attacked the Cossack squads, killed 3 soldiers and wounded 3 soldiers. This time, Musa Khan was seen with Mohammad-Qoli Khan in Ardabil. According to Levashov, in September 1730, many insurgents gathered in Lankaran and Arkivan districts. As the whole of Karganrud revolted, general Famitsy sent colonel Stupish with a detachment of 500 troops. In 13 December, he came from Astara to Karganrud and returned to Astara on 13 January 1731 when colonel Stupish burnt several villages and destroyed a large number of rebels. Thus, the uprising showed that the native people were not inclined to the Russians. When Musa Khan returned to Astara in September 1730, taking into account his prestige among the population, the Russian officials reappointed him.

According to the Treaty of Rasht which signed on 1 February 1732, Russia undertook the territories of south of the Kura river, and according to the Treaty of Ganja in 1735, the territories of north of the Kura river were returned to the Persia, and Russian troops were completely withdrawn from these territories. In 1730s, a large part of the region was ruled by Musa Khan, who recognized Nader's power. It should also be noted that in this period, the situation in the region was extremely problematic. The continuous wars led by Nader and heavy tax policies have seriously worsened people's situation a great deal and triggered rebellions in the region. Nader ruthlessly suppressed one of these rebellions in Astara in 1734.

== Economy ==
Astara and Lankaran were among the important cities through trade routes, specially Astara was through the silk routes of northern Iran. That much of the silk transported for manufacture in Italy at this time indeed originated in Iran. seta talani was the name of silk of Talish. Apparently, the Chinese silk was no match to the silk of Talish in type and price.

== list of governors ==
=== Astara ===
- Mirza Mohammad Talish (?–1530s)
- Qobad Khan (?–1539)
- Bayandor Khan I (1539–1581)
- Hamzeh Khan I (1581–1592)

In 1593, Shah Abbas I granted the region to Farhad Khan Qaramanlu as tuyul.

- Bayandor Khan II (1610–1628)
- Saru Khan (1628–1648)
- Qalich Khan (1648–1659)
- Hamzeh Khan II (1684–1697)
- Musa Khan

=== Lankaran ===
- Koke Takhan (Note: Ebrahim Khan Shirazi?) (1695–1697)
- Abbas-Qoli Khan (1697–1726)
- Aziz Khan (1726– )

== Footnotes ==
=== Sources ===
- Floor, Willem (2001). Safavid Government Institutions. Costa Mesa, California: Mazda Publishers. ISBN 1-568591-35-7.
- Khansuvarov, Razzaq (18 November 2011). "Yusiku Ocağı" [Hearth of Yusiku]. Tolışon Sədo [Voice of Talishis] (in Azerbaijani). No. 6. p. 3 – via talish.org.
- Maeda, Hirotake (2015). "New Information on the History of the Caucasus in the Third Volume of Afzal al-tavarikh". In Bläsing, Uwe; Arakelova, Victoria; Weinreich, Matthias (eds.). Studies on Iran and The Caucasus: In Honour of Garnik Asatrian. Leiden: Brill. pp. 107–114. ISBN 978-90-04-30201-3.
- Mammadova, Irada (2002). "Talış (Lenkeran) Hanlığı" [Talish (Lankaran) Khanate]. In Güzel, Hasan Celal; Çiçek, Kemal [in Turkish]; Koca, Salim (eds.). Türkler (in Turkish). Vol. 7. Translated by Sadik Sadikov. Istanbul: Yeni Türkiye. pp. 101–112. ISBN 975-6782-40-4.
- Mammadova, Irada (2007). "Lənkəran xanlığının yaranmasına dair" [About the Origination of Lankaran Khanate]. Elmi Əsərlər [Scientific Works] (in Azerbaijani). 21. Baku: Institute of History, NAS of Azerbaijan: 49–63.
- Matthee, Rudolph P. (1999). The Politics of Trade in Safavid Iran: Silk for Silver, 1600–1730. Cambridge: Cambridge University Press. ISBN 0-521641-31-4.
- Matthee, Rudi (2012). Persia in Crisis: Safavid Decline and the Fall of Isfahan. London: I.B. Tauris. ISBN 978-1-84511-745-0.
- Muradov, Vidadi (2019). "Political and socio-economic history of Lankaran-Astara region of Azerbaijan (18th and early 20th centuries)". Azərbaycan Xalçaları [Azerbaijani Carpets]. 9 (28–29). Baku: Azer-Ilme: 118–139. ISSN 2304-330X.
- Nasiri, Mirza Naqi (2008). Floor, Willem (ed.). Titles & Emoluments in Safavid Iran: A Third Manual of Safavid Administration. Translated by Willem Floor. Washington, D.C.: Mage Publishers. ISBN 1-933823-23-2.
- Newman, Andrew J. (2006). Safavid Iran: Rebirth of a Persian Empire. London: I.B. Tauris. ISBN 978-1-84511-830-3.
- Panahi, Abbas; Kohansal Vajargah, Hassan (Winter 2012). "The importance of Guilan silk and its economic significance at Safavid period in Caspian region". Caspian Journal of Environmental Sciences. 10 (1). Rasht: University of Guilan: 123–129. ISSN 1735-3033.
- Reid, James J. (1983). Tribalism and Society in Islamic Iran, 1500–1629. Malibu, California: Undena Publications. ISBN 0-890031-25-8.
- Shahvar, Soli [in Persian]; Abramoff, Emil (2018). "The Khan, the Shah and the Tsar: The Khanate of Talesh between Iran and Russia". In Matthee, Rudi; Andreeva, Elena (eds.). Russians in Iran: Diplomacy and Power in the Qajar Era and Beyond. London: I.B. Tauris. pp. 24–48. ISBN 978-1-78673-336-8.
- Tapper, Richard (1997). Frontier Nomads of Iran: A Political and Social History of the Shahsevan. Cambridge: Cambridge University Press. ISBN 0-521-58336-5.
