= Asad bey Talyshkhanov =

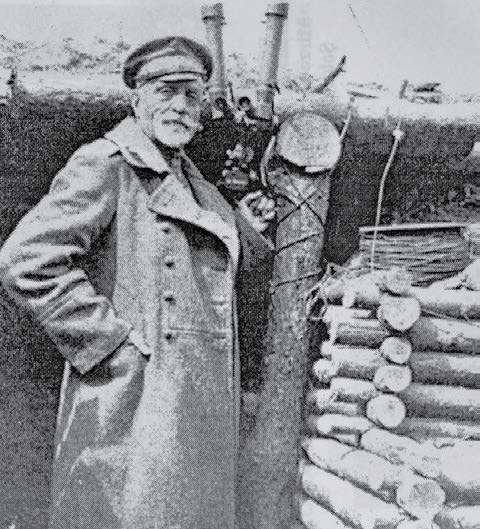
- Mir-Asad bey Talyshkhanov, major-general in the Russian army during World War I, 1916
- Born: November 16, 1857; Temir-Khan-Shura, Derbent Governorate of the Russian Empire
- Died: 1921 (aged 63–64)
- Allegiance: Russian Empire
- Branch: Artillery
- Service years: 1876–1917
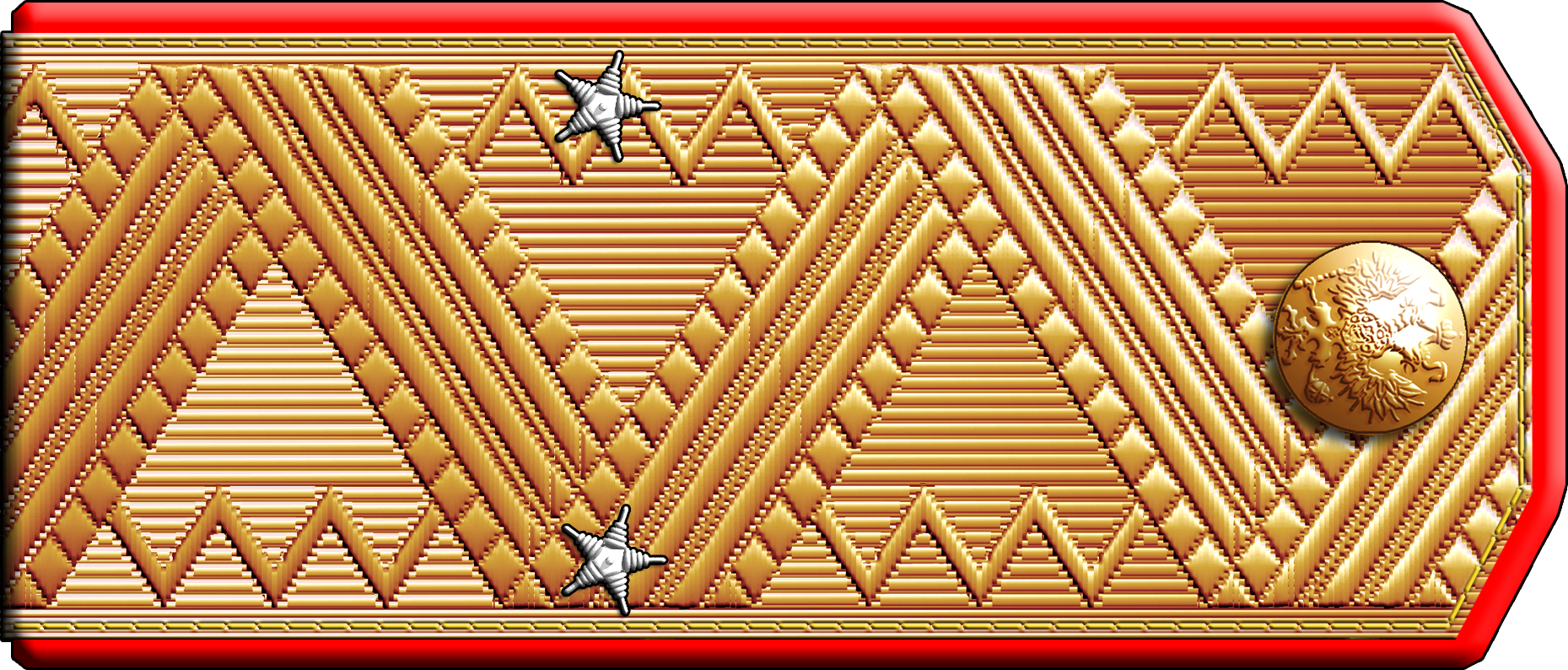
- Rank: Major general of the Imperial Russian Army
- Commands: 52nd Artillery Brigade (since July 25, 1915)
- Conflicts: Battle of Geok Tepe; World War I
- Awards: Order of St. Stanislaus, 3rd class with swords and a bow (1882); Order of St. Anna, 3rd class with swords and a bow (1888); Order of St. Stanislaus, 2nd class (1896); Order of St. Anna, 2nd class (1899); Order of St. Vladimir, 4th class with a bow (1902); Order of St. Stanislaus, 1st class Order of St. Anna, 1st class Order of St. Vladimir, 3rd class Gold Sword for Bravery (1916)
- Spouse: Farkhanda-begum khanum

Asad-bey Talyshkhanov (November 16, 1857 — March 28, 1921) was a Russian major general, who came from a family of Talysh khans.

== Biography ==
=== Career ===
Asad khan (bey) Talyshkhanov was the son of Mir Ali Khan and the great-grandson of Mir-Mostafa Khan of the Talysh Khanate. He received his general education at the Baku Real Gymnasium. On September 1, 1876, he entered the 2nd military Konstantin school. After graduating from college, he was promoted to warrant officer in the 1st category and was assigned to the 8th artillery brigade. October 13, 1878 he was transferred to the 21st artillery brigade. In the period from 1880 to 1881, he participated in a campaign against the Turkmen-Tekins (Battle of Geok Tepe), including the siege and capture of the Geok Tepe fortress on January 12, 1881. For military successes in the Battle of Geok Tepe he was awarded the orders of St. Stanislaus 3rd class and St. Anna 3rd class as well as a silver medal "For the capture of Geok Tepe."

November 29, 1882 he was promoted to lieutenant and on February 8, 1883, he was appointed treasurer. On December 22, 1884, he was seconded to the Caucasian District Artillery Directorate. On December 5, 1885, he was appointed assistant to the adjutant of the Caucasian District Artillery Administration with enrollment in field foot artillery. In 1888 he was promoted to staff captain. On March 14, 1890, he was seconded to the Tbilisi artillery workshop as the head of the locksmith department.

In 1891 he was approved as an assistant to the senior adjutant of the Caucasian District Artillery Directorate. Since 1896, with the rank of captain, he was approved as the head and senior adjutant of the 1st inspector drill and training department of the Caucasian District Artillery Directorate.

According to the "Collection of the Materials for Description of Places and Tribes of the Caucasus" Mir Asad-bey helped the linguist and ethnographer L. G. Lopatinsky in checking the Talysh texts he had collected in the Talysh language. In the "Collection" Mir Asad-bey was listed as "Talysh".

July 27, 1899 promoted to lieutenant colonel. On March 1, 1900, he was enrolled in a variable composition and on August 27 of the same year he successfully completed the course at the Officer Artillery School. On February 27, 1902, he was appointed commander of the 3rd battery of the 20th artillery brigade. Then, from September 13, 1902, he was commander of the 6th battery of the 1st East Siberian Artillery Brigade. On November 14, 1902, he was appointed commander of the 1st battery of the 21st artillery brigade located in the town of Buynaksk (Dagestan Republic).

In 1903, 1905, 1907, 1908 and 1910 he temporarily commanded the 1st division of the brigade. In 1903 and 1904 he was a reserve member of the temporary military court in the town of Buynaksk and in 1906 - in the Dyshlagar tract. In 1904-1906 he was approved by the chairman of the court of the society of officers. For 1907 and 1909 he was approved as a member of the commission for the management of officer-borrowed capital.

In 1908 he was approved as a member of the court of the society of officers. In 1907 and 1908 he temporarily commanded the 21st artillery brigade. On December 3, 1909, he received the right to wear a cross in memory of the 50th anniversary of the conquest of the Eastern Caucasus. From June 9, 1910, he became a colonel with the appointment of commander of the 2nd division of the 20th artillery brigade. On August 19, 1910, he was appointed commander of the 1st division of the 52nd artillery brigade. In 1910 he temporarily commanded the 52nd artillery brigade. On July 25, 1915, he was appointed commander of the 52nd artillery brigade. On November 23, 1915, he was promoted to major general (seniority from April 22, 1915).

It is known also that general Mir Asad-bey was the head of the military department in the Provisional Terek-Dagestan government, which was created in December 1917. He was arrested and held in the Arkhangelsk and Pertominsk Northern special purpose camps. Among a group of generals, he was shot near Arkhangelsk on March 28, 1921.

== Family ==
Mir Asad-bey Talyshkhanov was married to his cousin Farkhanda-begum khanum, the daughter of his uncle on the mother's side major general Mir Ibrahim-khan Talyshinsky, but they didn't have children.

== Awards ==
- Order of St. Stanislaus - 3rd class with swords and a bow (1882)
- Order of St. Anna - 3rd class with swords and a bow (1888)
- Order of St. Stanislaus - 2nd class (1896)
- Order of St. Anna - 2nd class (1899)
- Order of St. Vladimir - 4th class with a bow (1902)
- Order of St. Stanislaus - 1st class
- Order of St. Anna - 1st class
- Order of St. Vladimir - 3rd class
- Gold Sword for Bravery (08/16/1916)

== See also ==
- Mir-Mostafa Khan
- Battle of Geok Tepe
