= Nazarali Khan II =

Khan of Ardabil
- Reign: c. 1797 – 1808
- Predecessor: Nasir Khan Shahsevan
- Successor: Title abolished
- Naib: Farajulla Khan Shahsevan
- Clan: Sarikhanbayli
- Dynasty: Shahsevan
- Father: Nasir Khan Shahsevan
- Religion: Islam

Nazar Ali Khan II was the last Khan of Ardabil from c. 1797 to 1808.

== First reign ==
He was either the son of Nasir Khan Shahsevan or a grandson of Nazarali Khan Shahsevan through an unnamed son. He was mentioned as the khan of Ardabil in 1799. However, start of Russo-Persian War of 1804–1813 made his rule unstable. He sent an army under leadership of Ali Qoli Shahsevan aiding Abbas Mirza in June 1804. He hosted Fath Ali Shah in Ardabil, in 1805. His uncle Farajulla aided his brother-in-law Abu'l-Fath Khan Javanshir as part of Qajar army in Karabakh in 1806. After several defeats involving Shahsevan tribesmen, Abbas Mirza converted the city of Ardabil into a fortress, appointing Najafqoli Khan of Garus as the commander. Fearing of betrayal, Shahsevan chiefs fled to Talysh Khanate.

However, soon he was pardoned and reinstated, this time as governor of Ardabil later by Abbas Mirza in return of cavalry support against Russians and establishing marital alliance between Qajars and Talysh Khanate. However, failing this, he was imprisoned along with his uncle in 1809 and sent to Tabriz. Abbas Mirza abolished the khanate of Ardabil and converted it into a province of Qajar Iran, appointing his son Djahangir Mirza as its governor.

== Family and succession ==
He was married to Gamar-agha Khanum, daughter of Mir Mustafa Khan of Talish sometime. His daughter with her, Bahar Khanum (or Shahbeyim agha) was married to Qajar prince Sayf ol-Dowleh in 1831. According to Gustav Radde, he had two sons named Muhammad Khan and Balaja Khan. Mahammad khan was mentioned as chief of Shahsevans c. 1843.

== Sources ==
- Tapper, Richard (1997). Frontier Nomads of Iran: A Political and Social History of the Shahsevan. Cambridge University Press. ISBN 0521583365.
- Masjedi, Hossein (Summer 2002). "Sayf ol-Dowleh". Isfahan Journal of Sociology (in Persian) (13): 67–90.

Preceded by Nasir Khan Shahsevan	Khan of Ardabil; 1797 - 1808	Succeeded by Abolished; Djahangir Mirza becomes Qajar governor
