= Nasir Khan Shahsevan =

Khan of Ardabil
- Reign: 1792 – c. 1797
- Predecessor: Nazarali Khan Shahsevan
- Successor: Nazarali Khan II
- Clan: Sarikhanbayli
- Dynasty: Shahsevan
- Father: Nazarali Khan Shahsevan
- Religion: Islam

Nasir Khan Shahsevan was the second khan of the Ardabil Khanate from 1792 to c. 1797. He was the son of Nazarali Khan of Ardabil and was sometime married to a daughter of Ibrahim Khalil Khan. However, other sources mention his brother Farajulla Khan in that regard.

== Succession ==
After his death, Shahsevan tribes were divided, his brother Farajulla inherited Ardabil proper, while his nieces (sons of his brother Kuchek Khan) Ata Khan Shahsevan (1796–1828) and Shukrullah Khan Shahsevan (1789–1808) took control of Meshgin and Moghan respectively, another niece Khodaverdi Khan settling in near western border of Talysh Khanate. Latter two became vassals of Farajulla, while Farajulla himself appears to have ruled together with Nasir Khan's son, Nazarali Khan II.

However, other sources doubt even existence of Nasir Khan, such as Gustav Radde and Vladimir Markov. Radde doesn't even mention Nasir Khan, makes Nazarali and Badr Khans brothers. According to Markov, Nazarali and Kuchek Khans were sons of Badr Khan, again, not mentioning Nasir. His death year is not established.

== Sources ==
- Bournoutian, George (2021). From the Kur to the Aras: A Military History of Russia's Move into the South Caucasus and the First Russo-Iranian War, 1801–1813. Brill. ISBN 978-9004445154.
- Tapper, Richard (1997). Frontier Nomads of Iran: A Political and Social History of the Shahsevan. Cambridge University Press. ISBN 978-0-52158-336-7.

| Preceded by Nazarali Khan Shahsevan | Khan of Ardabil; 1792 - 1797 | Succeeded by Nazarali Khan II |
