= Evgeny Kozubsky =

Evgeny Ivanovich Kozubsky
- Євген Іванович Козубський
- Born: 1851; Odesa, Kherson Governorate, Russian Empire
- Died: 1911 (aged 59–60); Temir-Khan-Shura, Dagestan Oblast, Russian Empire
- Education: Imperial Novorossiya University
- Scientific career
- Fields: statistics; history; geography; ethnography

Evgeny Ivanovich Kozubsky (Ukrainian: Євген Іванович Козубський; Russian: Евгений Иванович Козубский; 1851–1911) was a Russian-Dagestani scholar, educator, and public official. He served as secretary of the Dagestan Regional Statistical Committee (1899–1911). From 1881 to 1902, he taught at the Temir-Khan-Shura Real School and the Temir-Khan-Shura Women's Gymnasium. He was the founder of the Ivan Kostemerevsky Museum of Handicrafts (1910–1911; officially opened posthumously in 1913). Kozubsky authored statistical collections and works on the history, ethnography, and geography of Dagestan and was an avid collector of folk art and crafts.

== Biography ==
Evgeny Kozubsky was born in 1851 in Odesa. He graduated from the Richelieu Gymnasium and the Faculty of History and Philology at Novorossiysk University, where he earned the degree of Candidate of Historical Sciences. From 1878 to 1881 he taught history at the Tiflis Gymnasium.

In 1881 he was transferred to Temir-Khan-Shura (now Buynaksk), the capital of the Dagestan Region. From 1881 to 1902 he taught history and geography at the Temir-Khan-Shura Real School and the Temir-Khan-Shura Women's Gymnasium. He also served as class mentor for grades II–VI, acted as inspector of the school, substituted as teacher of French, and was secretary of the gymnasium's pedagogical council (1884–1887). He participated in a commission on improving the teaching of Russian language and literature in the Caucasus Educational District and contributed to the development of the main and student libraries.

From 1899 to 1911 Kozubsky served as secretary of the Dagestan Regional Statistical Committee, a position to which he was appointed by resolution of the military governor of Dagestan, Prince Alexander Anatolyevich Baryatinsky. His main work in this role was the preparation of the Reviews of the Condition of the Dagestan Region and annual regional reports. In addition to statistical research, he studied the geography and history of Dagestan, promoted knowledge of its history, geography, and ethnography, and collected folk crafts for the future museum. He also organized the library of the Statistical Committee.

Between 1903 and 1906 he lived in Derbent, where he wrote the monograph The History of the City of Derbent.

In 1910–1911 he was a member of the Committee on the Establishment of the Dagestan Regional Museum. The committee's work was based on Kozubsky's 1901 report Essay on the Handicraft Industry in the Dagestan Region, delivered at the First Caucasus Congress of Workers in the Handicraft Industry, which justified the need for a museum. Kozubsky was responsible for committee administration and the organization of the museum, and in 1911 he was entrusted with its general management. The Ivan Kostemerevsky Handicraft Museum began work in 1912 and was formally opened in 1913.

Kozubsky died suddenly in 1911 and was buried in the Temir-Khan-Shura cemetery.

== Publications ==
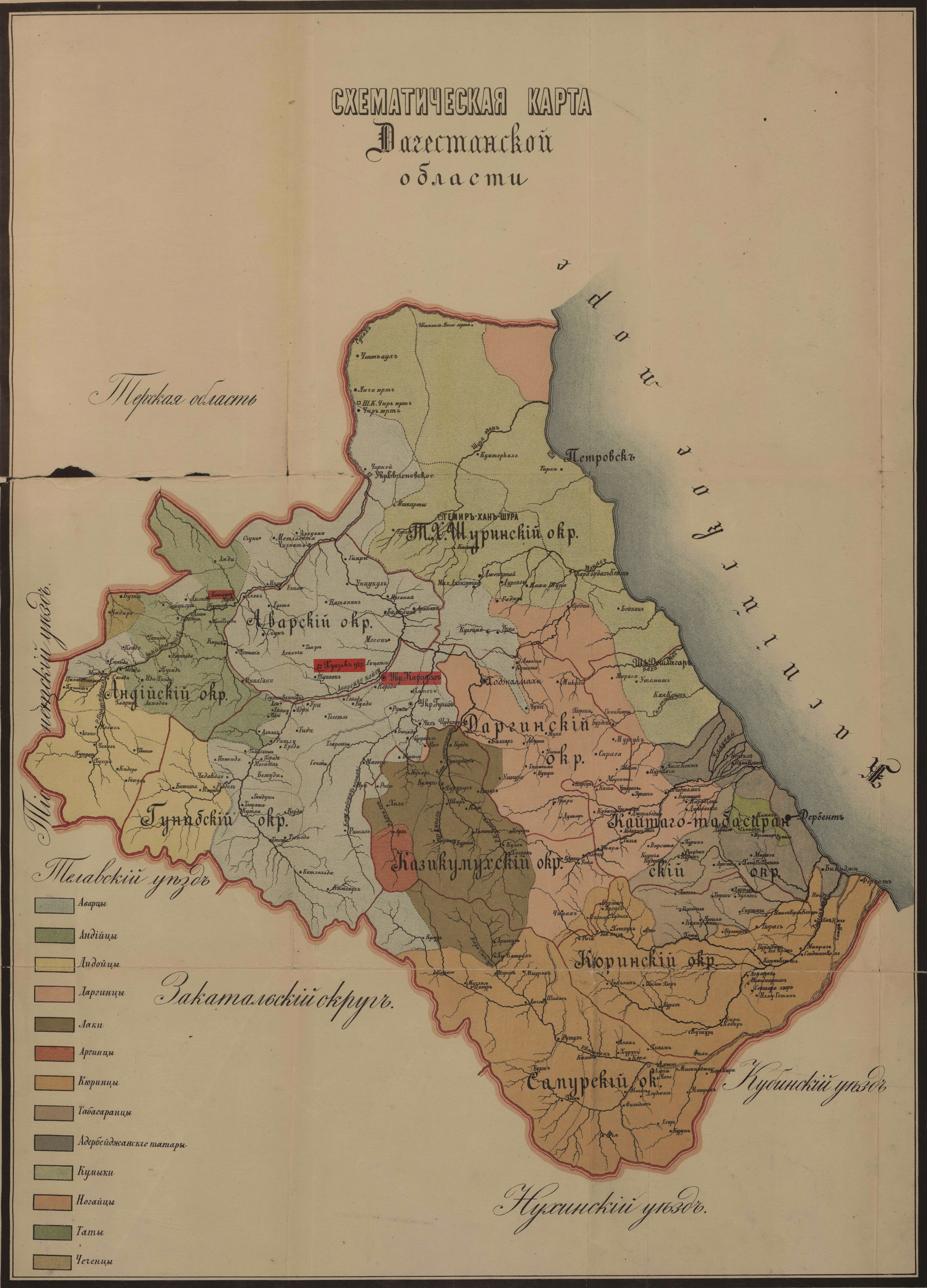
The ethnographic map of Dagestan from the annex to the “Memorial Book of the Dagestan Region” (1895) compiled by E. I. Kozubsky

Kozubsky published several monographs, including:

- Historical Note on the First Decade of the Temir-Khan-Shura Real School (1880–1889) (1890)
- Memorial Book of the Dagestan Region (1895)
- An Attempt at a Bibliography of the Dagestan Region (1904)
- History of the City of Derbent (1906)
- History of the Dagestan Horse Regiment (1909)

In 1894, in volume 19 of the Collection of the Materials for Description of Places and Tribes of the Caucasus, he published an Essay on the History of the City of Temir-Khan-Shura. In 1895 and 1902 he compiled indexes to thirty volumes of the Collection of the Materials for Description of Places and Tribes of the Caucasus. In the 1900s he edited two scientific compilations titled Dagestan Collection. In 1902, in the proceedings of the First Congress of Workers in the Handicraft Industry of the Caucasus (Tiflis), he published the article Essay on the Handicraft Industry in the Dagestan Region. He also contributed to the historical journal Russky Arkhiv (Moscow) and the newspaper Caucasus (Tiflis).

== Legacy ==
In 2006 the Institute of History, Archaeology and Ethnography of the Dagestan Scientific Center of the Russian Academy of Sciences held a scientific conference titled E. I. Kozubsky as a Researcher of the History of Dagestan in the Late 19th and Early 20th Centuries, dedicated to the 155th anniversary of his birth.
