= Mir-Hasan Khan =

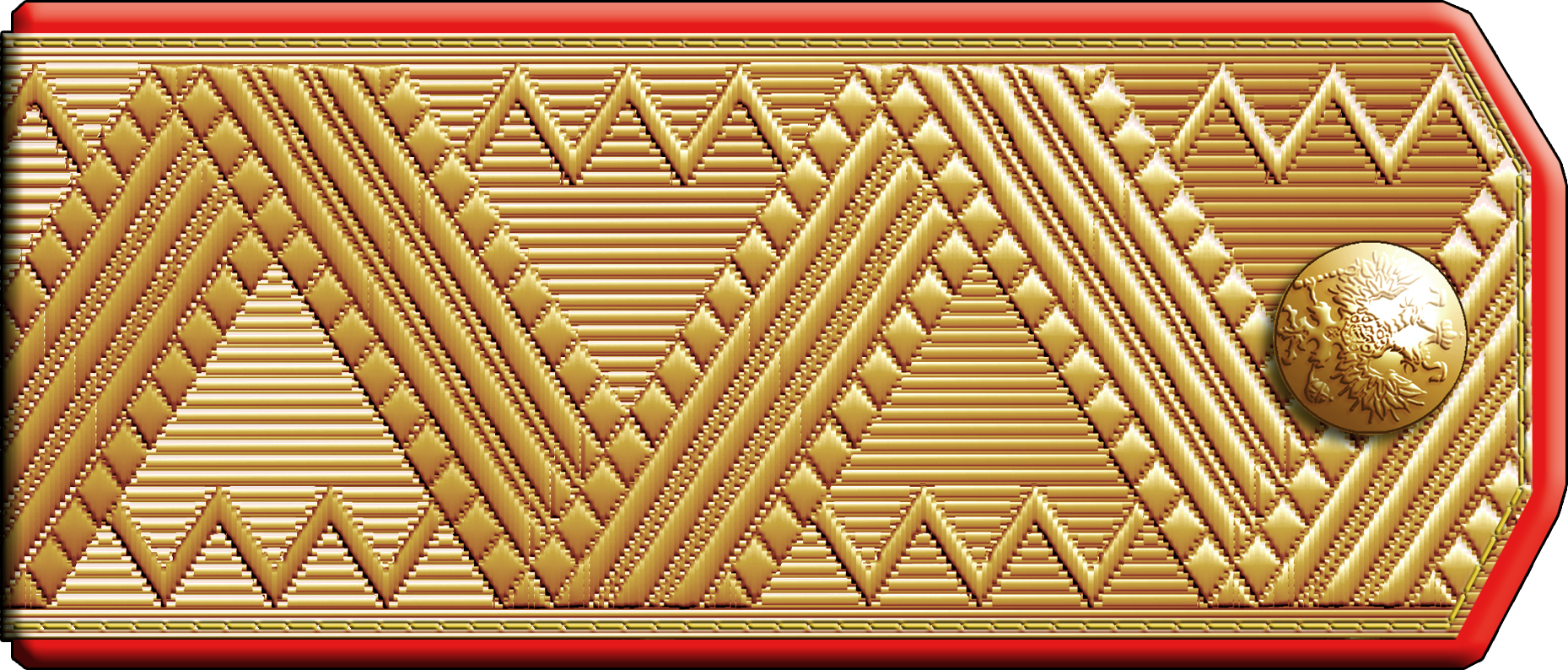
- Colonel general

Khan of Talysh
- Reign: 1814–1829
- Predecessor: Mir-Mostafa Khan
- Successor: Abolished
- Born: 1784; Lankaran, Talysh Khanate
- Died: 1832 (aged 47–48); Tehran, Qajar Iran
- Wives: Bika Khanum; Hayr-nisa Khanum; Gizkhanim Khanum
- Issue: sons: Mir Kazim Beg, Mir Abdullah Beg, Mir Javad-Beg, Mir Khanlar Beg, daughters: Nisa Khanum, Zahra Khanum and Sara Khanum
- Father: Mir-Mostafa Khan
- Mother: Fakhr-ul-Nissa Khanum
- Religion: Shia Islam

Mir-Hasan Khan (Persian: میر حسن خان تالشی; b. 1784 Lankaran – July 12, 1832 Tehran) was the last khan of the Talysh Khanate from 1813 to 1829. He was the son and successor of Mir-Mostafa Khan.

== Origin ==
He was born in the city of Lankaran, whose ancestry goes back to Zaid bin Ali. His grandfather Jamal al-Din Khan is one of the commanders of Nader shah, who established the semi-independent government of Talysh Khanate in 1747 after the death of shah.

== History ==
=== Rule ===
After the death of previous khan in 1814, the Russians inevitably recognized the rule of his eldest son Mir-Hasan Khan, but he contrary to his father's method opposed the expansionist goals of the Russians. In 1821, tsar Alexander awarded him the military rank of colonel general. One of the historians of that time, Seyid-Аli wrote about this in his work “Javahirnamei-Lenkoran”: “After the death of Mir-Mostafa Khan, the leaders of His Majesty the Russian tsar entrusted the administration of the Talysh khanate to Mir-Hasan Khan... He was given the rank of colonel. However, due to conflicting subordination the brothers and sisters of Mir-Hasan Khan were outraged, they did not like this step and even his mother Fakhrul-Nisa Khanum was outraged by this appointment of the Russian Empire and her son Mir-Hasan Khan opposed this.

In particular, the predatory policy against Mir Hasan Khan was led by Major M. С. Ilinsky. He secretly killed people loyal to the khan. This major, who was the commander of the Caspian naval battalion (660 people) and 50 Cossack horsemen forced the khan to flee to Iran. However, soon Ilyinsky was exiled from Talysh to the Telavi region of Georgia for causing harm to the locals.

On July 25, 1826, Mir-Hasan Khan with local fighters who raised an uprising and several thousand Qajar soldiers entered into battle with the Russian garrison located in Lankaran. After six days of fighting major Ilyinsky retreated to the island of Sara, leaving the rebels "not a fortress, but its ruins." Thus, the Russian military administration in the Talysh Khanate was overthrown.

=== Abolition of the khanate and the uprising ===
In 1826, the Talysh Khanate was again captured by Russia. This time, Mir Hasan Khan was declared a traitor, and the khanate was abolished. According to article 4 of the Treaty of Turkmenchay of 1828, the lands of the Talysh khanate were to be transferred to Russia. Mirza Yusuf Nersesov also writes about Hassan Khan's resistance to the Russian government.

Representatives of the upper class were removed from administrative work, and measures were taken to undermine the authority of religious leaders among the population. The amount of taxes collected from the peasants was doubled or tripled. Hatred of the Russian authorities grew among the majority of the population and they sent a letter to Iran and called on Mir-Hasan Khan in Lankaran to lead the movement against the Russians. In 1831, with the arrival of Mir-Hasan Khan in Lankaran many districts of the province were in revolt. The government sent Russian troops stationed in the cities of Shamakhi, Shaki and Derbent against the rebels. At the beginning of April 1831 the uprising was crushed. Khan again went to the homeland of the Qajars. Some rebel families were forced to move to Iran to escape punishment too.

After the assassination of Alexander Griboyedov on February 11, 1829, Mir-Hasan Khan took the opportunity and tried to take the region out of Russian control being in Northern Talysh, but he was arrested and handed over to Bala-khan (ruler of Kerganrud), and then to Djahangir Mirza (ruler of Ardabil) and imprisoned in the fort of Namin by order of Abbas Mirza. After enduring several months of imprisonment he again fled to Northern Talysh and tried several times to capture this area, when he was attacked by Russian troops, then he entered Southern Talish and fled to Anzali and from there to Mazandaran to the son of Fath-Ali Shah Qajar.

=== Death ===
At the end of 1831, Mir-Hasan Khan was in the province of Mazandaran. The son of Fath-Ali shah, Zillisultan Ali Mirza, ruled there. It is written in "Akhbarname": "He (i.e. Ali Mirza) urgently reported the arrival of Mir-Hasan Khan to Fath-Ali shah in Tehran. Fath-Ali shah was afraid and the prince sent him to Tehran. Mir-Hasan Khan was poisoned and killed there. This event took place on July 30, 1832".

At the same time, the Russian military leader of the Caucasian troops Ivan Paskovich also demanded that Mir-Hasan Khan be extradited to the Russian Empire and sent to Tbilisi, the capital of the Caucasian Viceroyalty.

But before that happened, Mir-Hasan Khan died on Thursday, July 12, 1832, in prison due to suffocation. However, in the book "Akhbarname" the cause of death of Hassan Khan is called drug poisoning.

== Family ==
Mir-Hasan Khan had three wives: the first was Bika Khanum, the sister of Hashim Khan Shirvanli, the second was Hayr-Nisa Khanum, the daughter of Galagayinli Mahammad-salah khan and the third was Gizkhanim Khanum, the daughter of Mughanli Muhammad Beg. He had 7 children. Four boys: Mir Kazim Beg, Mir Abdullah Beg, Mir Javad-bey, Mir Khanlar Beg and three girls: Nisa Khanum, Zahra Khanum and Sara Khanum.

The descendants of Mir-Hasan Khan still live in Masally, Lankaran, Astara, Baku of Azerbaijan and in Namin and Isfahan of Iran.

== Sources ==
- Bournoutian, George (2021). From the Kur to the Aras: A Military History of Russia's Move into the South Caucasus and the First Russo-Iranian War, 1801–1813. Brill. ISBN 978-9004445154.
- Shahvar, Soli [in Persian]; Abramoff, Emil (2018). "The Khan, the Shah and the Tsar: The Khanate of Talesh between Iran and Russia". In Matthee, Rudi; Andreeva, Elena (eds.). Russians in Iran: Diplomacy and Power in the Qajar Era and Beyond. I.B. Tauris. pp. 24–48. ISBN 978-1-78673-336-8.
