= Golden Weapon for Bravery =

Russian award for bravery

Awarded by Russia
- Type: Military order
- Established: 7 August 1720
- Eligibility: Top and senior military officers
- Awarded for: Distinction in combat

Statistics
- Total inductees: more than 13,000

The Gold Sword for Bravery (Russian: Золотое оружие "За храбрость") was a Russian award for bravery. It was set up with two grades on 27 July 1720 by Peter the Great, reclassified as a public order in 1807 and abolished in 1917. From 1913 to 1917 it was renamed the Saint George Sword (Георгиевское оружие) and considered one of the grades of the Order of St. George.

== Gallery ==
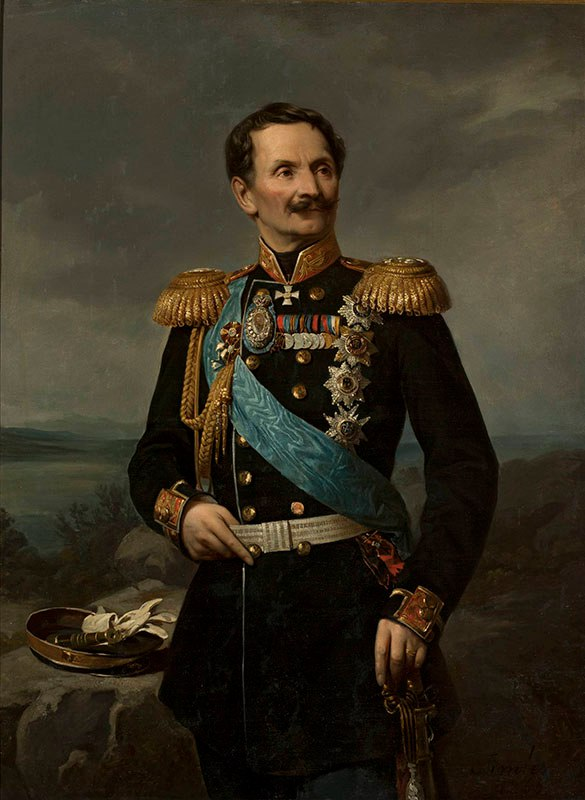
Field marshal Friedrich W. Rembert von Berg with the Gold Sword for Bravery

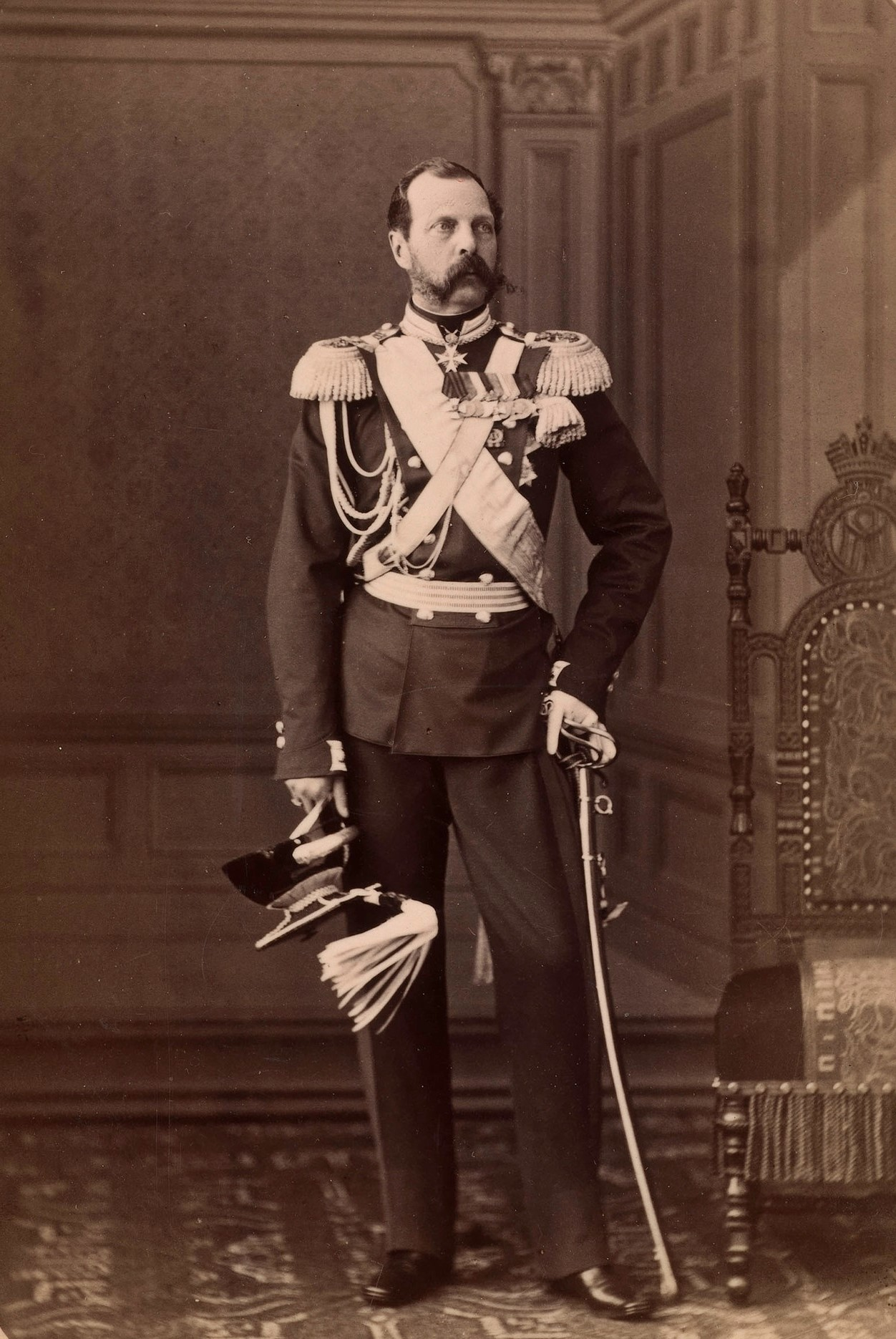
Tsar Alexander II of Russia with the Gold Sword for Bravery

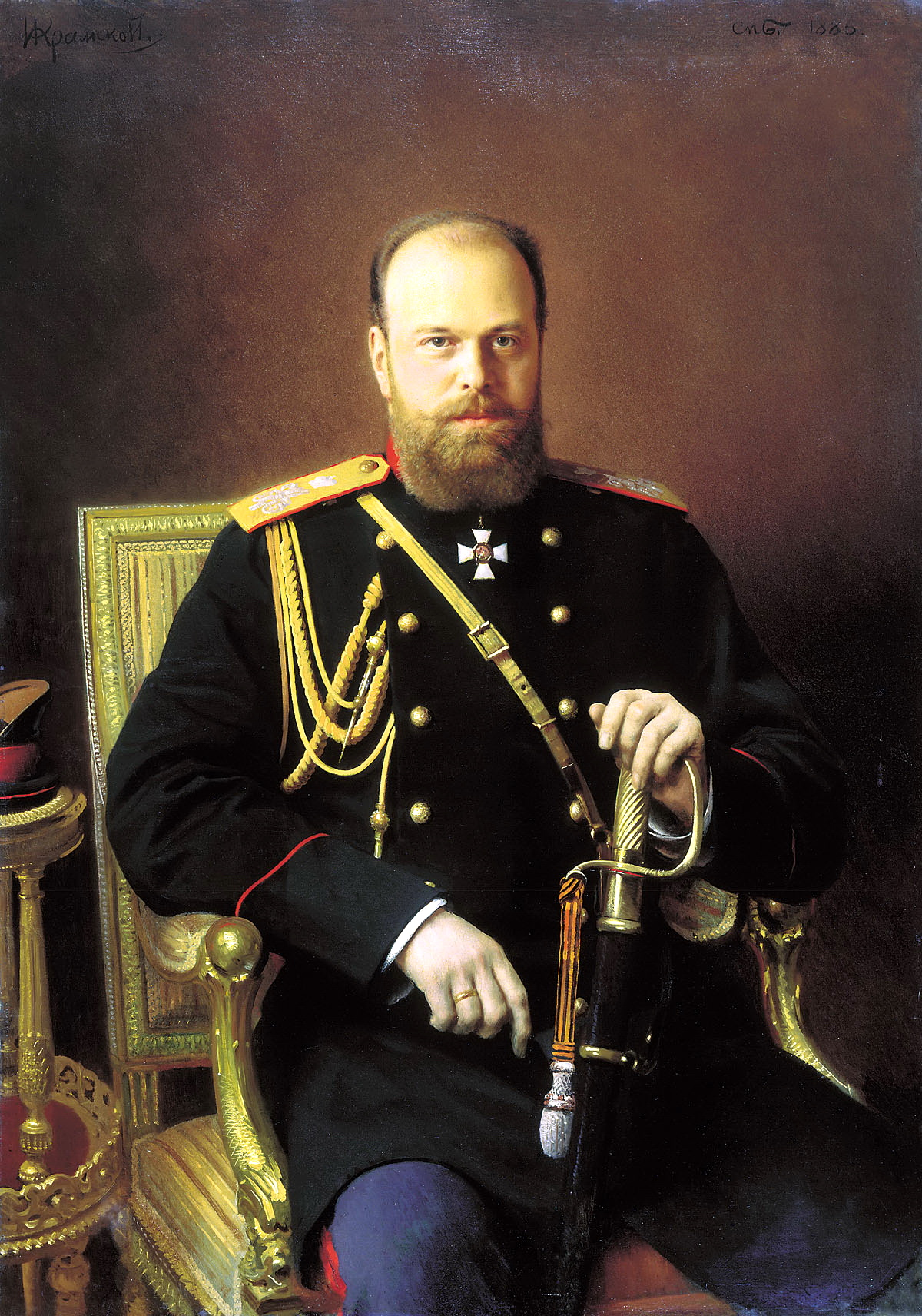
Tsar Alexander III of Russia with the Gold Sword for Bravery

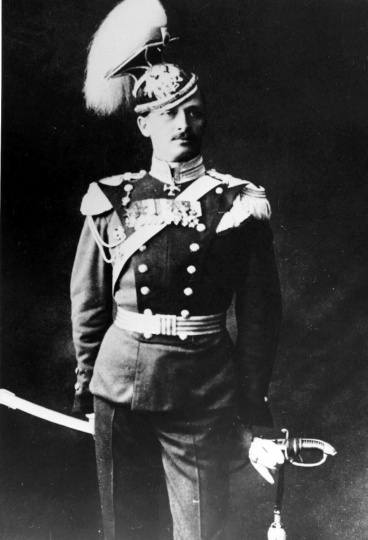
Baron Carl Gustaf Emil Mannerheim with the Gold Sword for Bravery

== Select recipients ==
- General Alexander von Kaulbars
- Generalissimo Alexander Suvorov
- Field Marshal Mikhail Kutuzov
- General Adjutant Huseyn Khan Nakhchivanski
- General Vladimir May-Mayevsky
- General Pyotr Bagration
- General Mikhail Loris-Melikov
- Field Marshal Peter Wittgenstein
- Field Marshal Ivan Paskevich
- Field Marshal Hans Karl von Diebitsch
- Admiral Alexander Menshikov
- General Mikhail Gorchakov
- Field Marshal Mikhail Vorontsov
- General Nikolay Muravyov-Karsky
- General Vasili Bebutov
- Field Marshal Friedrich Wilhelm Rembert von Berg
- General Yegor Tolstoy
- Tsar Alexander II
- General Aleksey Brusilov
- General Dmitry Nadyozhny
- General Anton Denikin
- Admiral Alexander Kolchak
- Admiral Pyotr Kitkin
- Tsar Alexander III
- General Ilya Duka
- General Mikhail Miloradovich
- General Mikhail Drozdovsky
- General Georgi Emmanuel
- General Peter von Wrangel
- Major General Carl Gustaf Emil Mannerheim (later Marshal and President of Finland)
- General Anatoly Pepelyayev
- General Anton Turkul
- General Maciej Sulkiewicz
- Major General Asad-bey Talyshkhanov

== Sources ==
- "Золотое оружие" . Brockhaus and Efron Encyclopedic Dictionary (in Russian). 1906.
