= Mirza Mohammad Talish =

Governor of Astara
- Born: Mirza Mohammad Mihrani
- Died: 942 AH / 1535–6 AD
- Burial: Pir Qotb al-Din cemetery, Baghcheh Sara, Astara, Iran 38°26′51.5112″N 48°49′33.41964″E
- House: Mihranids
- Father: Qobad
- Military career
- Allegiance: Safavid Iran
- Conflicts: Battle of Marv

Mirza Mohammad Mihrani (Persian: میرزا محمد مهرانی) known as Mirza Mohammad Talish (Persian: میرزا محمد تالش) was an Iranian nobleman and prominent military commander of Talysh origin. He was a descendant of Mihranids and his ancestors were the hereditary governors of Astara. Mirza Mohammad was the governor of Astara, and later became the Safavid governor of Yazd. He was married to a sister of Sultan-Ali Beg Chākirlu, the Aq Qoyunlu governor of Ardabil.

Mirza Mohammad appears in sources from 1500. He rebuked his serving official, Hamzeh Beg, for attempting to assassinate Ismail I (r. 1501–1524) during his residence in Talish, but soon weakened in his own support. He was intending to betray Ismail but was dissuaded by another follower of Ismail. He was a very active campaigner for the Shah Ismail and participated in numerous expeditions. Under Shah Ismail, he was ranked among the Qizilbash tiyūl-holders. It is not clear whether he remained the government of Astara since he appeared in command of qurchi troops of Talish during these campaigns.

Another post that he held during Ismail's reign, was the superintendent of the Safavid Shrine.

== Sources ==
- Ghereghlou, Kioumars (October–December 2017). "Chronicling a Dynasty on the Make: New Light on the Early Ṣafavids in Ḥayātī Tabrīzī's Tārīkh (961/1554)". Journal of the American Oriental Society. 137 (4): 805–832. doi:10.7817/jameroriesoci.137.4.0805 – via Columbia Academic Commons.
- Nasiri, Mirza Naqi (2008). Floor, Willem (ed.). Titles & Emoluments in Safavid Iran: A Third Manual of Safavid Administration. Translated by Willem Floor. Washington, D.C.: Mage Publishers. ISBN 978-1-933823-23-2.
- Neʿmatollahi, Behrouz (2002). تاریخ جامع آستارا و حکام نمین [Comprehensive History of Astara and Rulers of Namin] (in Persian). Ardabil: Sheykh Safi al-Din. ISBN 964-6822-12-6.
- Reid, James J. (1983). Tribalism and Society in Islamic Iran, 1500–1629. Malibu, California: Undena Publications. ISBN 0-890031-25-8.
