= Ardabil Khanate =

18th–19th century khanate

Ardabil Khanate خانات اردبیل
- 1747–1808
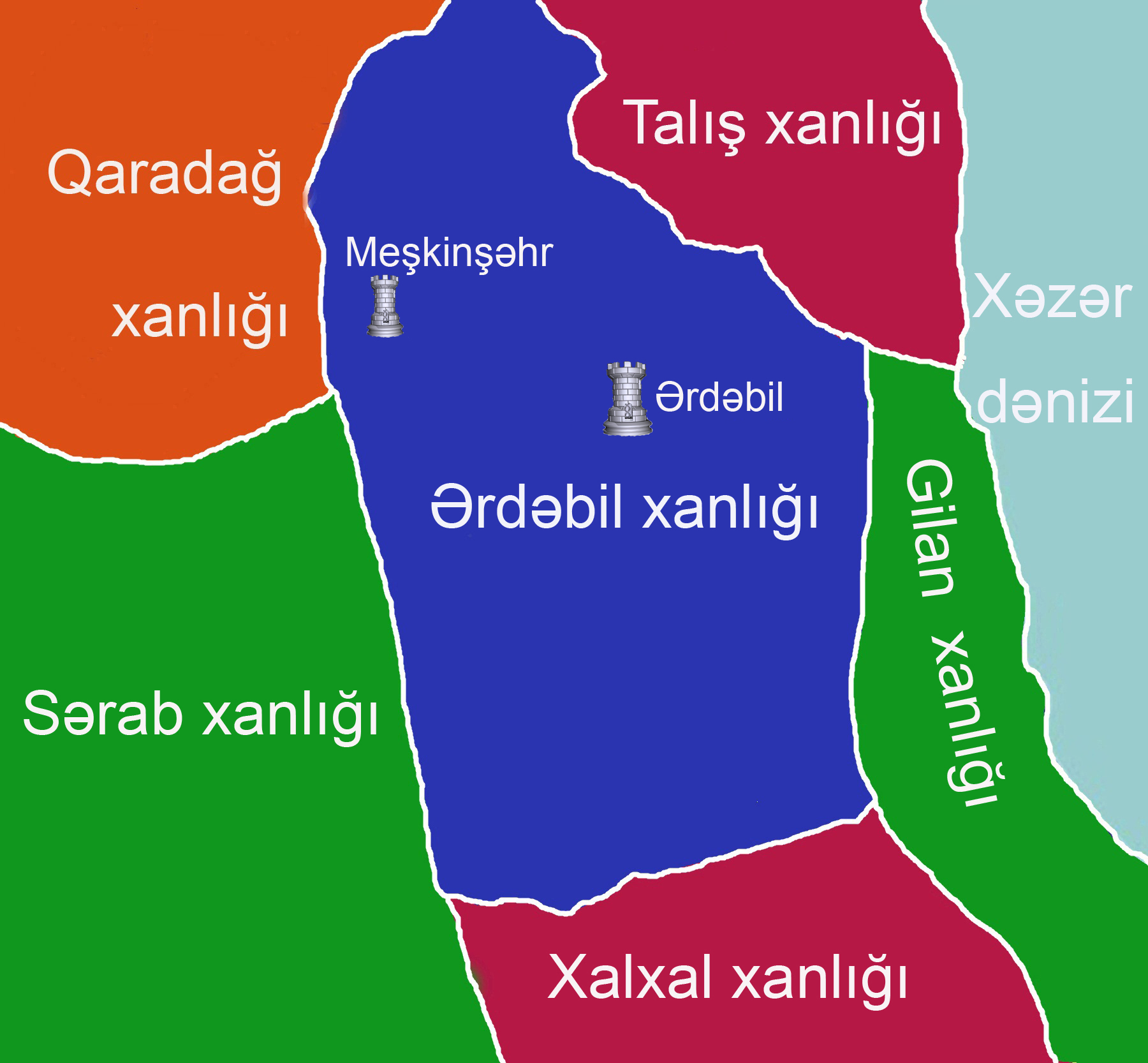
- Khanate of Ardabil with the borders
- Status: Khanate
- Capital: Ardabil
- Common languages: Persian (official), Azerbaijani (Majority)
- Religion: Islam
- History
  - Established: 1747
  - Independence from Afsharids: 1747
  - Disestablished: 1808
Preceded by	Succeeded by
Afsharid Iran	Qajar Iran

Ardabil Khanate (Persian: خانات اردبیل) was an 18th–19th century khanate based in Ardabil. It was established by Badr Khan in 1736, who attended the coronation of Nader Shah in January 1736. The khanate was ruled by Sarikhanbayli clan of Shahsevan tribal alliance. It was disestablished in 1808 and converted to a province of Qajar Iran.

== List of rulers ==
- Badr Khan Shahsevan (1736–1747) as paramount chief of Shahsevans
- Nazar Ali Khan Shahsevan (1757 – 1792) acknowledged as khan by Karim Khan Zand)
  - Tala Hassan Khan (ruled as puppet of Fath-Ali Khan of Quba in 1784–1785)
- Nasir Khan Shahsevan (1792–1797)
- Nazarali Khan II (1797–1808)

== Sources ==
- Bournoutian, George (2021). From the Kur to the Aras: A Military History of Russia's Move into the South Caucasus and the First Russo-Iranian War, 1801–1813. Brill. ISBN 978-9004445154.
- Tapper, Richard (1997). Frontier Nomads of Iran: A Political and Social History of the Shahsevan. Cambridge University Press. ISBN 978-0-52158-336-7.
