= Akhbar-nameh =

The Akhbar-nameh is a Persian-language chronicle on the history of Talish. It was composed by Mirza Ahmad ibn Mirza Khodaverdi, the vizier of the two last Khans of the Talysh Khanate.

== Sources ==
- Shahvar, Soli [in Persian]; Abramoff, Emil (2018). "The Khan, the Shah and the Tsar: The Khanate of Talesh between Iran and Russia". In Matthee, Rudi; Andreeva, Elena (eds.). Russians in Iran: Diplomacy and Power in the Qajar Era and Beyond. London: I.B. Tauris. pp. 24–48. ISBN 978-1-78673-336-8.
