= Nazar Ali Khan Shahsevan =

Nazarali Khan Shahsevan

Khan of Ardabil
- Reign: c. 1757 – 1792
- Predecessor: Badr Khan
- Successor: Nasir Khan Shahsevan
- Born: c. 1735; Sarikhanlu, Safavid Iran
- Died: 12 December 1792 (aged 56–57); Ardabil, Ardabil Khanate
- Clan: Sarikhanbayli
- Dynasty: Shahsevan
- Father: Badr Khan Shahsevan
- Religion: Islam

Nazarali Khan Shahsevan was the khan of the Ardabil Khanate from c. 1757 to 1792.

== Early life ==
He was born to Badr Khan c. 1735 in Sarikhanlu. However, according to German-Russian explorer Gustav Radde, he was Badr Khan's brother ruling in Ardabil.

== Reign ==
He was attacked by Panah Ali Khan of Karabakh, who captured and installed his relative Dargahqoli beg Javanshir on Ardabil. He forced Nazarali's sister Shahnisa to marry his son Ibrahim in 1749. Being a member of Sarikhanbayli branch of Shahsevans, he was confirmed as the khan of Ardabil by Karim Khan Zand sometime during his reign.

After Karim Khan's death in 1779 he was attacked by Hedayat-Allah Khan of Gilan, who imprisoned him in Bandar-e Anzali. However, he was later freed from captivity when population rose against Hedayat Khan. Taking advantage, Nazarali Khan gathered his troops and captured Rasht, forcing Hedayat Khan to flee on 17 May 1780. He was restored by the help of Amir-Guna Khan, ruler of Khalkhal Khanate and Ali-Morad Khan Zand. Nazar Ali Khan meanwhile went over to Karabakh Khanate.

Fatali Khan of Quba, constantly striving to expand his possessions, soon undertook a campaign to the south. In the spring of 1784, having gathered a significant army, he crossed the Aras and in August captured the cities of Ardabil and Meshgin, expelling Nazar Ali Khan; appointed Tala Hassan Khan of Javad as governor in Ardabil, and certain Khodaverdi Bey in Meshgin. However, soon later Nazar Ali returned with combined forces of Ibrahim Khalil of Karabakh and Ahmad Khan Donboli of Khoy in 1785 and expelled the Quba puppets.

He died on 12 December 1792 was succeeded by his son Nasir Khan.

== Family ==
His second son Farajulla (d. 1830) was married to his own cousin Bakhshi Khanum, daughter of Ibrahim Khalil. His third son was named Kuchek Khan.

== Sources ==
- Tapper, Richard (1997). Frontier Nomads of Iran: A Political and Social History of the Shahsevan. Cambridge University Press. ISBN 0521583365.

Preceded by Badr Khan	Khan of Ardabil c. 1757 - 1792	Succeeded by Nasir Khan Shahsevan
