= Jamal al-Din Khan =

Khan of the Talysh Khanate
- In office 1747–1786
- Succeeded by: Mir-Mostafa Khan

Personal details
- Children: Mir-Mostafa Khan
- Parent: Mir-Abbas Beg (father)

Jamal al-Din Khan (Persian: جمال الدین خان) was the first khan of the Talysh Khanate under Iranian suzerainty, ruling from 1747 to 1786.

== Biography ==
Jamal al-Din Khan was the son of the local Talysh leader Mir-Abbas Beg, who claimed to be a seyyed (descendant of the Islamic prophet Muhammad). In order to demonstrate his loyalty to the Iranian shah (king) Nader Shah (r. 1736–1747), Mir-Abbas Beg sent Jamal al-Din as a hostage to his court. Due to his dark complexion, Jamal al-Din earned the nickname Qara ("the Black") Beg. He rose to important posts in Nader Shah's army and was assigned the task of putting down Kalb Hoseyn Beg's uprising in southern Talish in 1744. The murder of Nader Shah in 1747 led to the fragment of his empire; in the same fashion as the other rulers in the Southern Caucasus, Jamal al-Din (who had succeeded his father) established himself as a semi-independent ruler, marking the start of the Talysh Khanate, which used Lankaran as its capital. A khanate was a type of administrative unit governed by a hereditary or appointed ruler subject to Iranian rule. The title of the ruler was either beglarbegi or khan, which was identical to the Ottoman rank of pasha. The khanates were still seen as Iranian dependencies even when the shahs in mainland Iran lacked the power to enforce their rule in the area.

Jamal al-Din preserved his fathers correspondence with Russia, sending a letter to its empress Catherine II (r. 1762–1796) that pledged his allegiance to her and offered the Russian troops access to his domains. The Zand ruler of Iran, Karim Khan Zand (r. 1751–1779) was informed of this by Zohrab Beg, one of the grandees of Talish. As a result, Jamal al-Din was sent to a prison in Shiraz, the Zand capital. Karim Khan soon reversed his decision after he had discovered that Zohrab Beg had made an agreement with his rival Hedayat-Allah Khan, who ruled Gilan. Jamal al-Din was thus reinstated in Talish as its governor, being given the title of khan. After destroying Zohrab's army and seizing control of Uluf and Dashtvand, Jamal al-Din now directed his attention towards Astara. He captured and killed its ruler Shoja al-Din, but failed to establish his rule in Astara, as the city was given to Shoja al-Din's son by Karim Khan in an attempt to restrict Jamal al-Din's authority. The latter, however, was able to conquer a number of towns in Talish and gain control over most of the region.

After having made peace with Hedayat-Allah Khan in 1767, Karim Khan confirmed the latter as the ruler of Gilan. The following year, Hedayat-Allah Khan launched an attack into Talish, where he defeated and captured Jamal al-Din, imprisoning him in Rasht. He then installed Jamal al-Din's son Mir-Askar Beg as the governor of Talish. In 1772, Jamal al-Din broke out of prison and went back to Talish. In 1784, the Talysh Khanate was attacked by Fath Ali Khan of Quba, the most dominant khan in the Caucasus. He made Jamal al-Din his vassal and also had him imprisoned in Baku. Due to pressure from Russia, however, Jamal al-Din was soon released. In 1786, Jamal al-Din died and was succeeded by his son Mir-Mostafa Khan.

== Sources ==
- Bournoutian, George (1976). The Khanate of Erevan Under Qajar Rule: 1795–1828. University of California. ISBN 978-0-939214-18-1.
- Bournoutian, George (2016). The 1820 Russian Survey of the Khanate of Shirvan: A Primary Source on the Demography and Economy of an Iranian Province prior to its Annexation by Russia. Gibb Memorial Trust. ISBN 978-1-909724-80-8.
- Bournoutian, George (2021). From the Kur to the Aras: A Military History of Russia's Move into the South Caucasus and the First Russo-Iranian War, 1801–1813. Brill. ISBN 978-9004445154.
- Hambly, Gavin R. G. (1991). "Iran during the reigns of Fath 'Alī Shāh and Muhammad Shāh". In Avery, Peter; Hambly, Gavin R. G.; Melville, Charles Peter (eds.). The Cambridge History of Iran. Vol. 7. Cambridge: Cambridge University Press. pp. 144–173. ISBN 0-521-20095-4.
- Kazemzadeh, F. (1991). "Iranian relations with Russia and the Soviet Union, to 1921". In Avery, Peter; Hambly, Gavin R. G.; Melville, Charles Peter (eds.). The Cambridge History of Iran. Vol. 7. Cambridge: Cambridge University Press. pp. 314–349. ISBN 0-521-20095-4.
- Shahvar, Soli [in Persian]; Abramoff, Emil (2018). "The Khan, the Shah and the Tsar: The Khanate of Talesh between Iran and Russia". In Matthee, Rudi; Andreeva, Elena (eds.). Russians in Iran: Diplomacy and Power in the Qajar Era and Beyond. I.B. Tauris. pp. 24–48. ISBN 978-1-78673-336-8.

| Preceded by Afsharid rule | Khan of the Talysh Khanate; 1747–1786 | Succeeded by Mir-Mostafa Khan |
