= Badr Khan Shahsevan =

Paramount Chief of the Shahsevan
- Reign: 1736–1747
- Predecessor: Ali Qoli Khan Shahsevan
- Successor: Nazarali Khan
- Born: Sarikhanlu, Safavid Iran
- House: Sarikhanbayli
- Dynasty: Shahsevan
- Father: Ali Qoli Khan Shahsevan
- Religion: Islam

Badr Khan Shahsevan (Persian: بدر خان شاهسون) was the chief of the Shahsevan tribe in 18th century, living in what is the modern Ardabil Province of Iran.

== Biography ==
He was from Sarikhanbayli branch of Shahsevan tribal group. He was described as either the son of Sarikhan bey himself or his uncle Allahqoli Pasha's son, in both cases a descendant of Yunsur Pasha, leader of the Shahsevans who may have been from Afshars. According to Radde, he was the khan of Meshgin, while his brother Nazarali Khan was ruling in Ardabil.

He was present in the qurultai of Nader in January 1736, when he was forced to accept him as the new shah with ropes around his neck. He was subsequently appointed as paramount chief of the Shahsevan tribe in the region and accompanied Nader on various campaigns. His subsequent fate after death of Nader Shah is unknown.

== Sources ==
- Tapper, Richard (1997). Frontier Nomads of Iran: A Political and Social History of the Shahsevan. Cambridge University Press. ISBN 0521583365.

Preceded by Ali Qoli Khan Shahsevan	Paramount Chief of the Shahsevan; 1736 - 1747	Succeeded by Nazarali Khan
