= Qızılağac, Masally =

Qızılağac
- Municipality
- Location within Azerbaijan
- Coordinates: 38°59′34″N 48°47′46″E
- Country: Azerbaijan
- Rayon: Masally

Population
  - Total: 5,152
- Time zone: UTC+4 (AZT)
  - Summer (DST): UTC+5 (AZT)

Qızılağac (also, Kizil’-Agach, Kizyl-Agach, Kyzylagach, and Kyzylagadzh) is a village and municipality in the Masally Rayon of Azerbaijan. It has a population of 5,152.
