= Derbent Governorate =

1846–1860 unit of Russia

Derbent Governorate Дербентская губерния
- Governorate of the Russian Empire
- 1846–1860
- Capital: Derbent
- History
  - Established: 1846
  - Disestablished: 1860
Preceded by	Succeeded by
Caspian Oblast	Dagestan Oblast

Derbent Governorate (Note: Russian: Дербентская губерния, pre-1918: Дербентская губернія, romanized: Derbentskaya guberniya) was an administrative-territorial unit (guberniya) of the Russian Empire in 1846–1860.

It was established by the 14 December 1846 decree of Nicholas I. In accordance with the "Regulations on the Administration of the Dagestan Oblast" (Положеніемъ объ управленіи Дагестанской областью, 5 April 1860), the Derbent Governorate was abolished, and most of the area became part of the Dagestan Oblast.
