= Javaher Nameh-ye Lankaran =

Javāher Nāmeh-ye Lankarān (Persian: جواهرنامه لنکران) is one of the works about the economic, geographical and historical life of the Talysh khanate, as well as the occupation of the territory by Russia. The work was by Seyidali Kazim bey oglu. It consists of only 43 pages and was written in 1869 in Persian.

== Structure ==
The work consists of an introduction, six chapters and a final word. The introduction of the work clarifies the purpose of its writing. In the first chapter of the work, the author tries to explain the word Lankaran, and in the second chapter the origin of the word. The third chapter of "Javāher Nāmeh-ye Lankarān" is dedicated to the borders and natural resources of Talysh khanate.The fourth chapter deals with the climate of Talysh khanate. The fifth chapter deals with the lives and tombstones of a number of saints who lived in the area. The sixth chapter of "Javāher Nāmeh-ye Lankarān" tells about the short history of Talysh khanate. Here, first of all, the period before the establishment of the khanate and the march of Agha Mohammad Shah Qajar is covered.

== Themes ==
The author describes Russia's plans of aggression as follows: After Nadir's death, Agha Mohammad Shah's attempt to capture Lankaran was unsuccessful. Fatali Shah, who wanted to subdue Mir Mustafa Khan by various means, was convinced that he would not be able to achieve his dream peacefully and marched to Lankaran with an army of 30,000. Mir Mustafa khan called the council to save the country from this difficult situation.The council, which said it was a great insult to submit to Iran, decided to seek Russian help. According to this decision, Mir Mustafa khan sent an envoy to Russia through his cousin Mirza Muhammad bey via Astrakhan.The last word of the work is dedicated to archeological and historical monuments in Lankaran and surrounding areas. The author's work is an artistic description, chronicle. Despite the limited description of the events in the work, it is very valuable in terms of studying the history of the Talysh khanate.In the Azerbaijani historiography of the 60s and 80s of the twentieth century, along with the problem of the Russian occupation of Northern Azerbaijan as a whole, the study of the historical development of individual khanates and the history of their subordination to Russia became widespread. The formation of khanates, their internal and external situation, the relations of khanates with Russia, their annexation to the empire and other issues are the main themes of these works.
