= Mir-Mostafa Khan =

Mir-Mostafa Khan was the khan of the Talysh Khanate from 1786 to 1814. He was the son and successor of Jamal al-Din Khan. He was succeeded by his son Mir-Hasan Khan.

== Sources ==
- Bournoutian, George (2021). From the Kur to the Aras: A Military History of Russia's Move into the South Caucasus and the First Russo-Iranian War, 1801–1813. Brill. ISBN 978-9004445154.
- Shahvar, Soli [in Persian]; Abramoff, Emil (2018). "The Khan, the Shah and the Tsar: The Khanate of Talesh between Iran and Russia". In Matthee, Rudi; Andreeva, Elena (eds.). Russians in Iran: Diplomacy and Power in the Qajar Era and Beyond. I.B. Tauris. pp. 24–48. ISBN 978-1-78673-336-8.

Preceded by Jamal al-Din Khan	Khan of the Talysh Khanate; 1786–1814	Succeeded by Mir-Hasan Khan
