= Collection of the Materials for Description of Places and Tribes of the Caucasus =

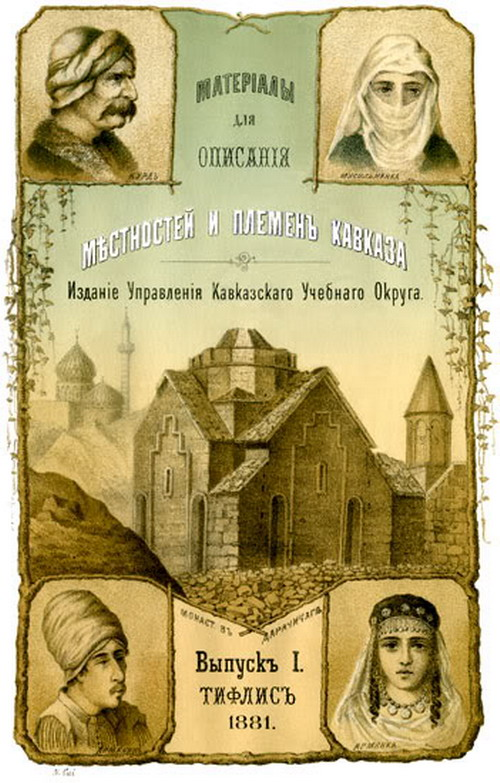
- Discipline: Area studies
- Language: Russian

Publication details
- History: 1881–1926

Indexing
- OCLC no.: 17256568

Collection of the Materials for Description of Places and Tribes of the Caucasus (Russian: Сборник материалов для описания местностей и племён Кавказа, romanized: Sbornik materialov dlya opisaniya mestnostey i plemen Kavkaza or shortly СМОМПК) was an Orientalist journal that was published by the Office of the Caucasian Educational District in Tbilisi from 1881 to 1926.

Since 1881, the trustee of the Caucasian educational district Kirill Yanovsky (1822-1902) was in charge of the publication. The journal contained extensive material for the history, archeology, linguistics and ethnography of the Caucasus, essays on their history. Of great scientific interest are dictionaries and texts of the Caucasian peoples, legends about Narts, Great Russian and foreign songs, articles and materials about the life and customs of Armenians, Georgians, Azerbaijanis, Ossetians, Mountain Jews, Svans, Udis and other Caucasian peoples. The multi-volume work contains information about everyday life, writing, way of life, customs, folklore and much more that was collected by researchers after the final conquest of the Caucasus. The publication contains descriptions of villages and cities, essays on their history, life and crafts of the population. Historical, lyrical, everyday and ritual songs, legends reveal the beauty of the language and the spiritual essence of the peoples of the Caucasus.

The scientific value of this edition was recognized by Professor Vsevolod Miller in extensive reviews published in the "Journal of the Ministry of Public Education" in 1893. The magazine was published from 1881 to 1915 in Tbilisi in the printing house of the Main Directorate of the Viceroy of the Caucasus, but due to the war its publication was stopped. Only in 1926, thanks to the association of the North Caucasian mountain local lore organizations in Makhachkala, the 45th issue was published, and in 1929 - the 46th issue. From 1893 until 1915, the collection was published with a preface by Lev Lopatinsky. The main part of the authors of the publication are teachers, mostly teachers of local Caucasian schools and gymnasiums, who collected and recorded various materials. The period of publication of the journal was different, as materials accumulated, approximately 1-2 issues per year.
