= Vidadi Muradov =

Azerbaijani artist (1956–2021)

- Born: Vidadi Muradov; 5 March 1956; Barda, Azerbaijan SSR, Soviet Union
- Died: 5 November 2021 (aged 65)
- Awards: Shohrat Order
- Scientific career
- Fields: Carpets

Vidadi Aydin oglu Muradov (5 March 1956 – 5 November 2021) was an Azerbaijani carpet specialist and academic.

== Life ==
Vidadi Muradov was born on 5 March 1956 in Barda city of the Republic of Azerbaijan. During 1974–1980 he studied at the Moscow Cooperative Institute, Economy Faculty, to obtain a degree in the "Organization of Economy." From 1980 until 1994, he worked at different organizations of the republic as an economist. From 2006 until his death in 2021, he was the consultant of the Affairs Office of the President of the Republic of Azerbaijan. He was the founder of the scientific research and production center "Azer-Ilme," founded in October 1994. The objective of "Azer-Ilme" is to restore long-forgotten designs, produce high-quality carpets, and publicize the Azerbaijani carpets decorating a number of private collections and world museums. A member of the "Yeni Azerbaijan" Party, he was married and has three children.

In early 2021, Muradov was arrested and put under house arrest under charges of corruption and embezzlement. He later died on 5 November 2021 from cancer.

== Honors and awards ==
- Order of Shohret (glory) (7 March 2016)
