= Shahsevan =

Turkic tribe in northwestern Iran

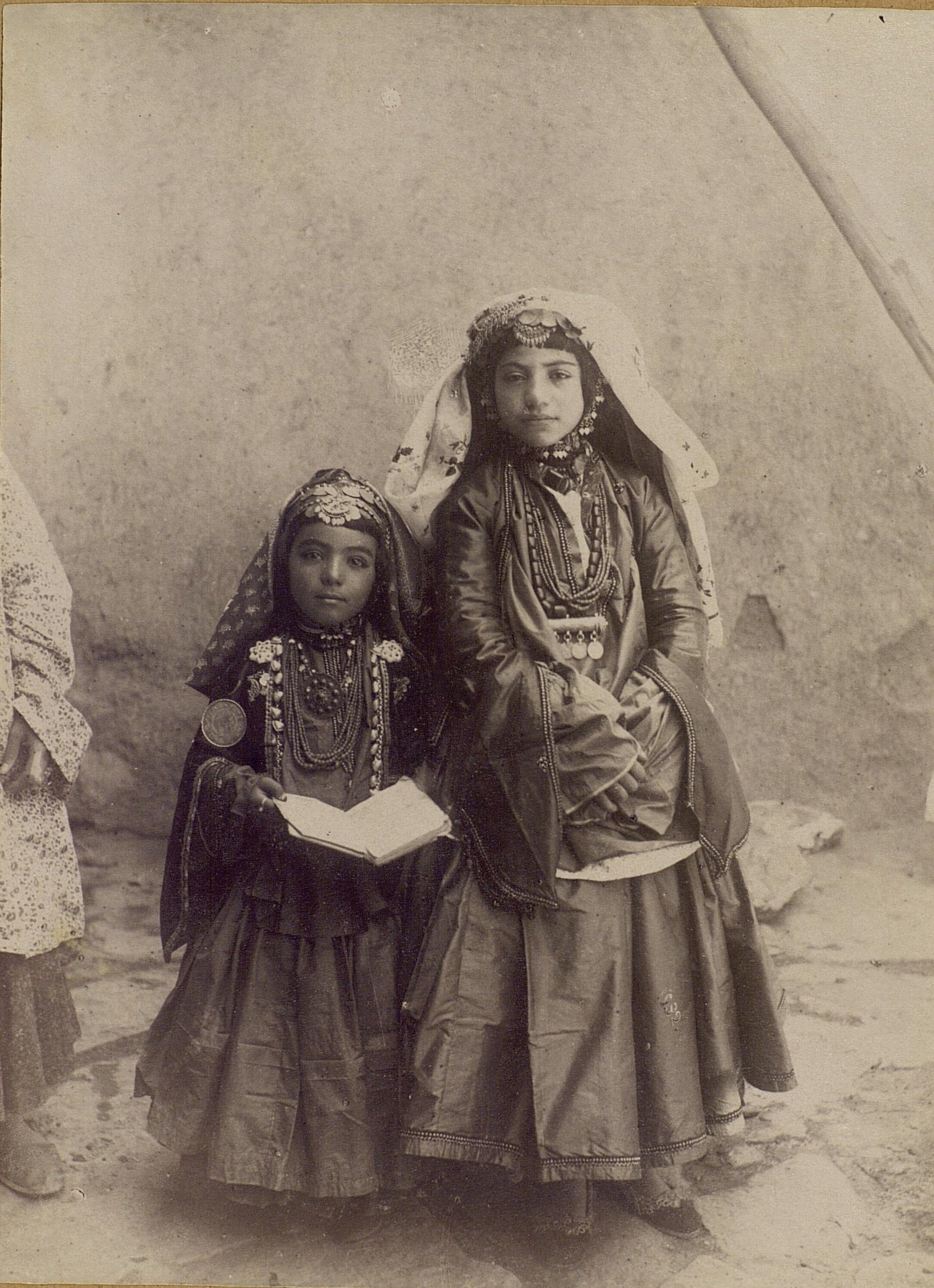
- Shahsevan girls from a rich family. Late 19th-century, Iran

Regions with significant populations
- Iran: 40,000 (1966); 30000 (2007)

Languages
- Azerbaijani (Shahsevani), Persian

Religion
- Shia Islam

The Shahsevan (Note: Also spelled Shahsavan and Shah-sewan.) (Azerbaijani: شاهسِوَن; Persian: شاهسون) are a number of Azerbaijani Turkish-speaking or Shahsevani dialect-speaking (sometimes considered to be its own dialect distinct from others like Azerbaijani) Turkic groups that live in northwestern Iran, mainly inhabiting the districts of Mughan, Ardabil, Kharaqan and Khamsa.

== History ==
=== Background ===
"Shahsevan" means "those who love the shah" in Turkic. In the past, the Shahsevan had a tribal and pastoral nomadic lifestyle, moving during summer 100–200 km to the south on the Sabalan and nearby ranges, in the districts of Ardabil, Meshginshahr, and Sarab, and during the winter to the Mughan region. They were a minority in this area, but like the settled majority (whom the Shahsevan call "Tat"), they were Shia Muslims and spoke Azerbaijani. The Shahsevan lived in a frontier region that was easily accessible and frequently traversed, unlike tribes like the Bakhtiari and the Qashqai who live in the Zagros Mountains. Nader Shah (in 1736) and Agha Mohammad Khan Qajar (in 1796) both selected Mughan as the location for their coronation. The Shahsevan differ from other nomadic tribal groups in Iran in a number of ways, including their history and location on the frontier, as well as their social and economic structure. Their alachig is what makes them most recognizable. When Turkic tribes from Central Asia entered Western Asia in the 11th century, they left behind this type of settlement and other cultural remnants.

Despite having a very extensively reported history since the early 18th-century, it is still unknown where the Shahsevan originated. Even though the ancestors of several of the tribes were of other origins such as Kurdish, Turkic identity and culture are predominate among them. Between the 16th and the 18th century, several tribal confederacies merged together to become the Shahsevan.

Three distinctly different accounts of the Shahsevan's history existed by the 20th century. The most well-known was that they were a brand-new tribe created as a result of the Safavid shahs' tribal and military policies. This is based on a passage from John Malcolm's History of Persia that says that the Shahsevan were created by Shah Abbas I (r. 1588–1629) to quell the chaos caused by the rebellious Qizilbash chiefs, who a century earlier had assisted Shah Ismail I (r. 1501–1524) in establishing the Safavid dynasty. However, neither contemporary European travellers nor Safavid records make mention of this story. The Russian orientialist Vladimir Minorsky stated that "the known facts somewhat complicate Malcolm's story" and that "it may be doubted if a single regularly constituted tribe was ever founded by Shah Abbas under the name Shah-sewan." British anthropologist Richard Tapper states that Malcolm's story "is based on a misreading of chronicle sources." The Shahsevan are described as a personal militia and a royal guard in subsequent passages of Malcolm's book, and there is some proof that a military corps with the name Shahsevan existed in the middle of the 17th century.

Statements such as shāhī-sēvan kardan are often used in the Safavid chronicle Tarikh-e Alam-ara-ye Abbasi of Iskandar Beg Munshi to mean "to make appeal to the faithful." During the 1581 and 1584 uprisings, Shah Mohammad Khodabandeh (r. 1578–1588) had already employed similar expressions; "Shah Mohammad", according to Iskandar Beg Munshi, "having launched the shāhī-sēvan (appeal), ordered that all those of the Turkoman tribe who were servants and partisans of this hearth should rally round His Majesty." These spur-of-the-moment appeals catered to the religious values of the followers of the Safavid dynasty, whose shahs not only claimed descent from the Twelve Imams, but also that they were their incarnations.

Various records of the customs of the Shahsevan of Mughan by 19th-century Russian officials have been highlighted by Minorsky. Although they do not conflict with the writings of Malcolm, they are still different. They also consider Anatolia to have been the original homeland of the Shahsevan, who left the place under the leadership of a certain Yunsur Pasha. They depict the Shahsevan tribes as being divided between beyzadä (descendants of the first immigrants) and commoners, and ruled by elbey/ilbegi (chieftains) who traced their ancestry back to Yunsur Pasha. They make reference to the current royal appointment of leaders as well as an earlier royal grant of pastures in Ardabil and Mughan. Their chiefs had likely created these stories to justify their rule over ordinary citizens as well as their possession of the pastures, which are the most essential asset for all of their nomadic adherents.

It is not possible to fully substantiate either the first or second versions of Shahsevan's origins. There are records of individuals and tribal groups in Mughan bearing the names of Shahsevan tribes in 16th-century sources. By the end of the 17th-century, Mughan and Ardabil was associated with the name Shahsevan, which was frequently used as a military title by members of Qizilbash tribes like the Afshar and Shamlu. The Qizilbash Tekeli and the Kurdish Shaqaqi and Mughanlu were other notable tribes in the area. Nevertheless, it is first during the 18th century that there is conclusive proof of a Shahsevan tribe or confederacy.

=== 18th and 19th century ===
Political map of the eastern part of the Southern Caucasus between 1795 and 1801

For few a years in the 1720s, Mughan and Ardabil served as one of the main places of confrontation as a result of the swift collapse of the Safavid dynasty to the Afghans at Isfahan as well as Ottoman and Russian incursions in northwest Iran. Years of calm had left the tribal communities of this frontier area unprepared for the political role that was suddenly forced upon them. In 1732, the Shahsevan were again under Iranian control due to the efforts of Nader Shah, who deported many tribes to his home province of Khorasan, including the Shaqaqi, Inallu, and Afshar. Nader Shah appears to have united and consolidated the tribes that remained in Mughan and Ardabil under the leadership of Badr Khan Shahsevan, one of his generals who took part in the wars in Khorasan and Turkestan.

Badr Khan was possibly a son of Aliqoli Khan, and belonged to the Sari-khanbeyli family, which was most likely descended from the Afshars of Urmia. Later stories connect Badr Khan with Yunsur Pasha. The Sari-khanbeyli family was related to leading Shahsevan tribes such as the Qojabeyli, Isali, Balabeyli, Mast-Alibeyli, Ali-Babali, Polatli, and Damirchili. The names of many of the lower caste tribes, such Ajirli and Beydili, suggest a Shamlu origin. Badr Khan Shahsevan's son or brother Nazar Ali Khan Shahsevan presided over Ardabil and its district during the chaotic decades that followed after Nader Shah's death.

During the Russo-Iranian wars of 1804–1813 and 1826–1828, Shahsevan territory constantly served as a battlefield. The conclusion of the wars led to the loss of the majority of their winter quarters, and many of them moving further south.

The Shahsevan were allowed by Russia to have restricted access to their former pasturelands in Mughan for a number of decades after the Treaty of Turkmenchay in 1828, but they disregarded the restrictions.

=== 20th century ===
In the early half of the 20th century, the Shahsevan achieved the height of their authority and prestige. Throughout the Iranian Constitutional Revolution of 1905–1911 and the years preceding up to Reza Khan's ascent, they took part in a number of significant events. A small number of Shahsevans joined the royalist forces occupying Tabriz during the winter of 1908–1909. The majority of the Shahsevan chiefs joined Rahimkhan Chalabianloo and Amir Ashayer Shatranlu in an alliance of tribes in eastern Azerbaijan during late 1909, declaring opposition to the Constitution and their intention to march to Tehran in order to reinstate the overthrown Mohammad Ali Shah Qajar. This occurred as the new nationalist government was struggling to take control of the nation. The Shahsevan pillaged Ardabil, gaining extensive news coverage in Europe, but were quickly defeated by nationalist forces from Tehran led by Yeprem Khan.

The Shahsevan were among the first of the major tribal groups to be subdued and disarmed by Reza's army in the winter and spring of 1922–1923. The tribes were incorporated into the new nation-state by the Pahlavi dynasty as equal groups led by acknowledged and obedient chiefs.

Urban areas dominated the Iranian Revolution of 1978–1979. The Shahsevan nomads themselves did not have much involvement, but established tribal members took part in protests at the Agro-Industry Company in Mughan and events in places like Mesghinshahr, Parsabad, Bileh Savar, and Germi. During these incidents, some former chieftains were killed, while others fled into exile. The Shahsevan were formally renamed Elsevan ("those who love the people (or tribe)") as part of the new regime's disapproval of anything having to do with royalty, but the new term was not universally embraced and by 1992 it was no longer in use. According to the Socio-economic Census of Nomads of 1986, the Shahsevan had about 6,000 families, just as they had in the mid-1960s, indicating a moderate return to pastoral nomadism among them, which was also occurring among other tribes in Iran at the time.

Meanwhile, urbanization has continued progressing in Mughan as a result of the continuing expansion of numerous government-sponsored projects. According to Tapper; "By the end of the century, Shahsevan pastoral nomadism did not seem likely to survive much longer."

== Ethnography ==
The tribal structure of the Shahsevens has a large number of different institutions, arranged in descending order. So the largest unit of the tribal structure will be the ethnic group, then the tribe, clan, gubak, ube and family. The gubak in the Shahseven tribes is the main tribal unit that forms the basis of the clan. Typically, gubaks consist of 20-30 families, which are engaged in driving a common herd from pasture to pasture. The gubaks themselves can be collectively referred to as a small separate tribe.

Ube also consists of several families with a joint household, but it is a smaller unit in relation to the gubak.

Some sources say that the Shahsevens have 11 tribes and 90 Ube. According to another division, this tribal union can be considered as 32 Mesginshahr tribes and 13 Ardabil tribes, which, in turn, are divided into smaller units.

The ethnographic group is managed by the Ilbeks. Ilbek is responsible for maintaining order and collecting taxes. In addition, a bek appointed by the Ilbeks is in charge of the local administration of the tribe. Aksakals (white-bearded) are the embodiment of the political, economic, religious and social elite.

== Culture ==
The traditional occupation of the Shahsevens was nomadic cattle breeding (breeding of sheep, cattle as a draft force, camels and horses). In the summer they roamed in the Sabalan mountains, in the winter in the Mugan steppe. From the end of the 19th century, the Shahsevens began the transition to sedentary agriculture.

The traditional dwelling of the Shahsevens is alachig.

Men's clothing - white or blue shirt, brown woolen trousers, Circassian coat, lamb hat, pistons . In winter, the Shahsevens wear long-sleeved lamb coats. They shave their heads, leaving curls on their temples, grow beards.

Women's costume - blue shirt, harem sirwal, arkhalig, blue chador, woolen stockings, chuvyaki, gold and silver jewelry. The woman's head is tied with a scarf.

Traditional food - pilaf, chowder, mutton, dairy products.

The Shahsevens preserve the tribal division and some pre-Muslim customs (including funeral ones).

The existence of rich pastures, as well as land suitable for breeding cattle and small ruminants, in conjunction with a climate suitable for animal husbandry, determined the main occupation of the Shahsevens. Thus, the basis of the economic component of the tribes is the breeding of cows, buffaloes, sheep, camels and goats

Women of the Shahseven tribes are engaged in weaving kilim, jajim, horse blankets and khurjibs, which also plays the role of economic support for the tribe

=== Language of the Shahsevanis ===
The Shahsevani dialect is either considered to be a dialect of the Azerbaijani language, or its own distinct Turkic dialect. According to Turkish Studies:

According to gathered information, the main properties of phonetic and structural of Shahsavani's Turkish have been determined. The most important features that distinguish Shahsavani's Turkish from other Turkish dialects in Iran, is the use of extension -Im/-Um (first-person singular suffix) and the extension of -sIn / -sUn (second person singular suffix). Being decentralized of Shahsavans and having the minority of population in their area of living, lead their language to destruction, on the other hand the influence of other dialect on the Shahsavani's Turkish can be seen clearly. Thus, by taking these points into account, recording the specifications of Shahsavan's dialect is necessary.

== Gallery ==
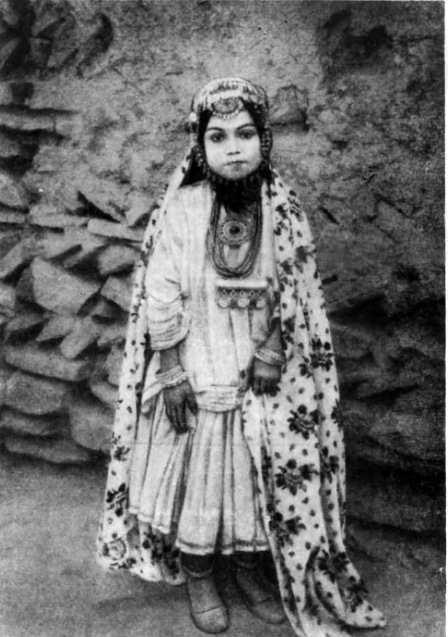
A Shahsevan girl in traditional dress

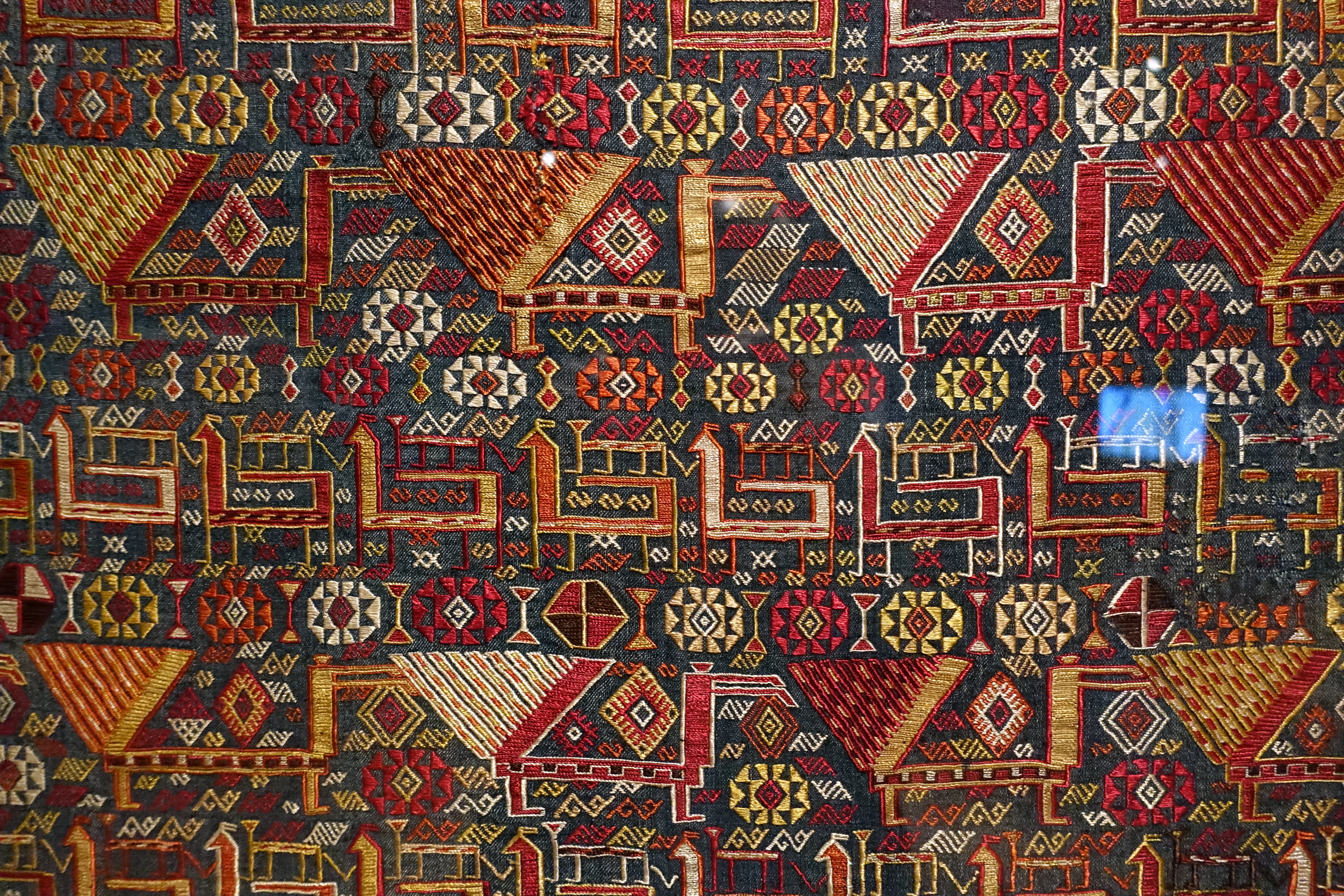
A Shahsevan horse cover, made of silk and metal-wrapped silk, 1850-1900 AD.

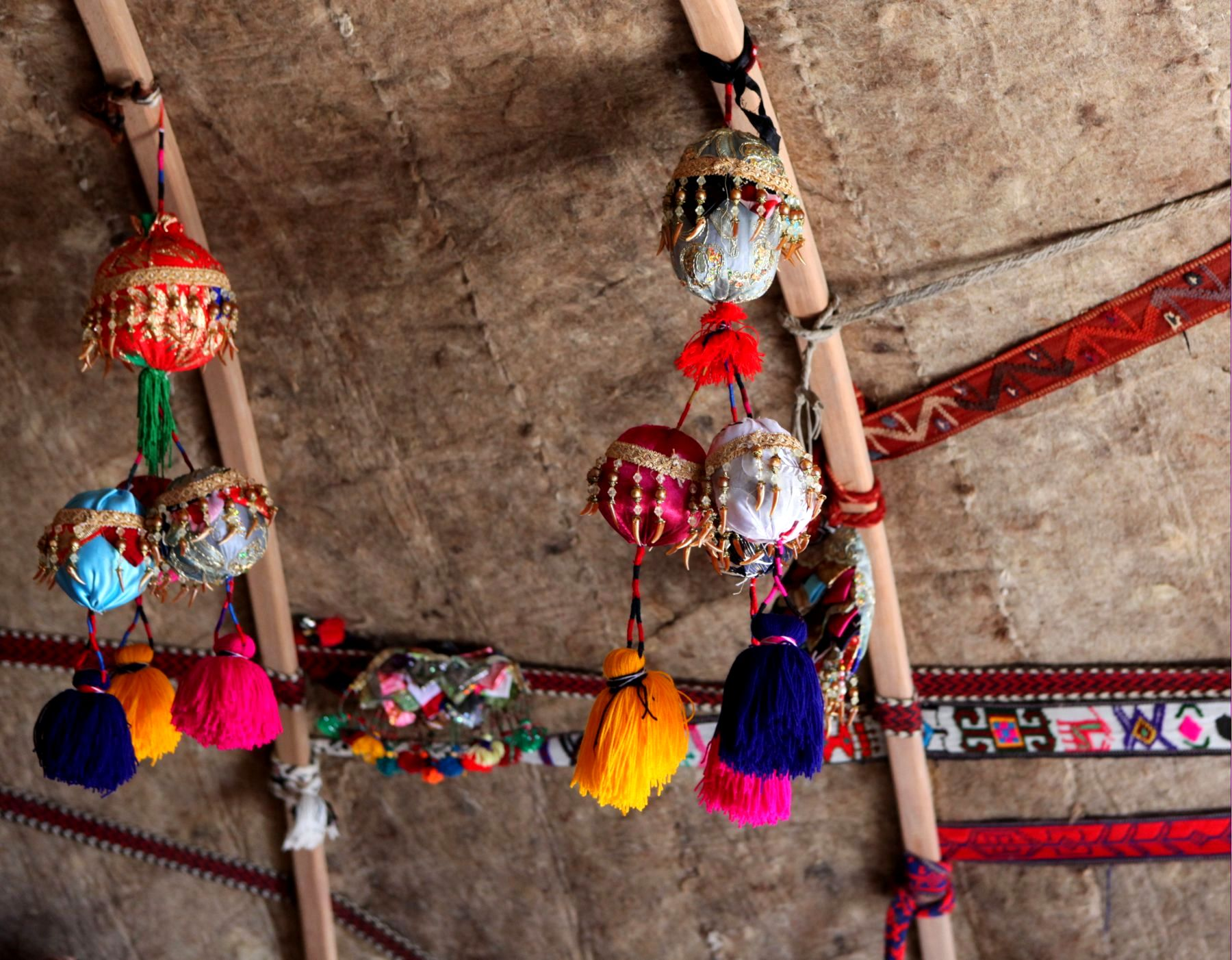
Decorations inside a Shahsevan nomadic tent.

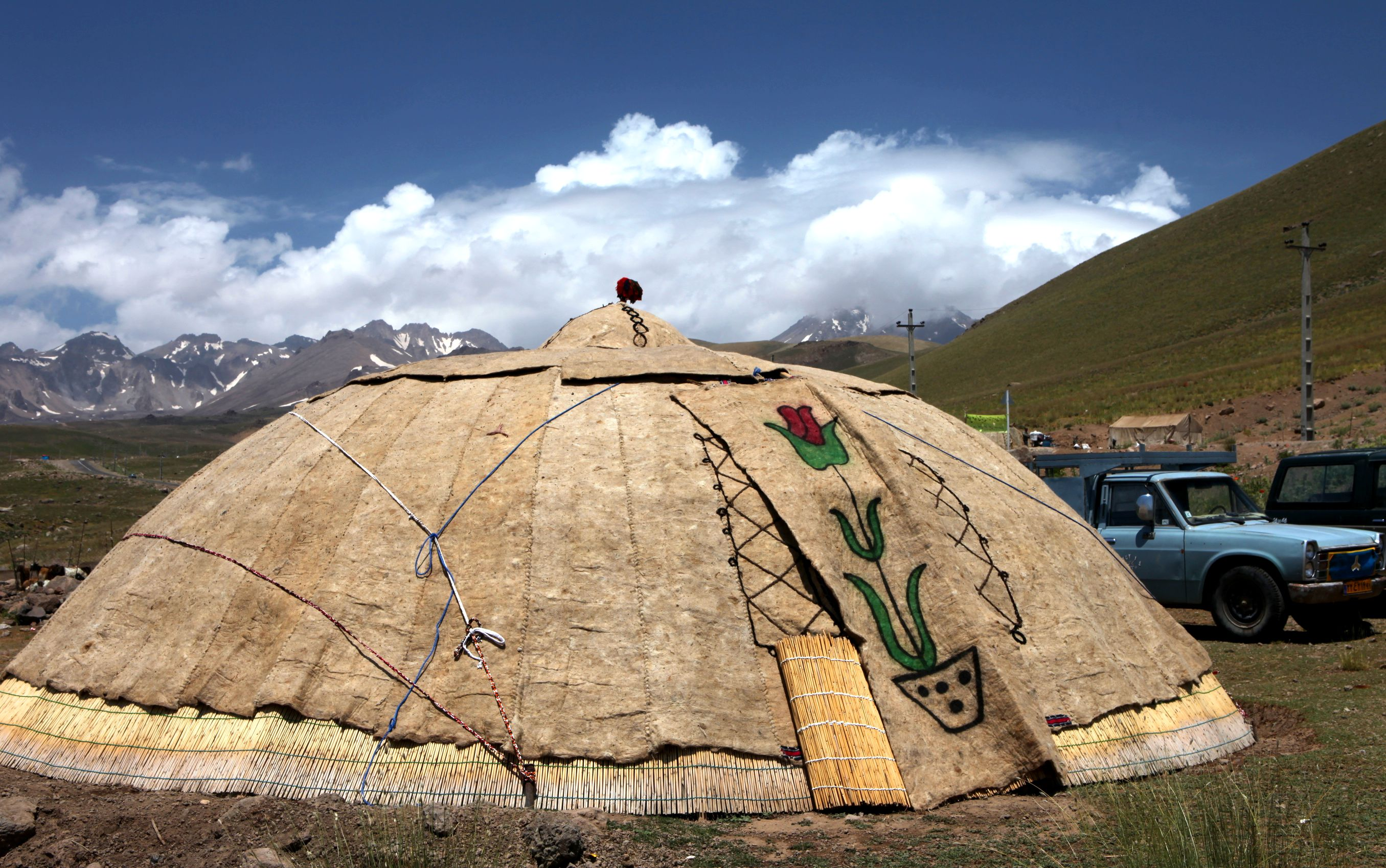
A (Alachig) felt tent used by Shahsevan nomads.

== Sources ==
- Ahmed, Akbar S. (2013). Islam in Tribal Societies: From the Atlas to the Indus. Routledge. ISBN 978-0415446723.
- Behrooz, Maziar (2023). Iran at War: Interactions with the Modern World and the Struggle with Imperial Russia. I.B. Tauris. ISBN 978-0-7556-3737-9.
- Minorsky, Vladimir (1936). "S̲h̲āh-sewan". In Houtsma, M. Th.; Arnold, T.W.; Basset, R.; Hartmann, R. (eds.). Encyclopaedia of Islam, First Edition (1913–1936). doi:10.1163/2214-871X_ei1_SIM_5282.
- Tapper, Richard (1997). Frontier Nomads of Iran: A Political and Social History of the Shahsevan. Cambridge University Press. ISBN 978-0-52158-336-7.
- Tapper, Richard (2010). "Shahsevan". Encyclopaedia Iranica.
