= Husaynzada =

Husaynzada (Azerbaijani: Hüseynzadə; Persian: حسین‌زاده, romanized: hoseynzâde; Russian: Гусейнзаде), also Husaynzade, Husaynzadeh and Gusein-Zade, is a surname built from Husayn and the Persian suffix zada. Notable people with the surname include:

- Ahmad Huseinzadeh (1812–1887), third Sheikh ul-Islam of the Caucasus
- Ali bey Huseynzade (1864–1940), Azerbaijani writer, thinker, philosopher, artist, doctor, and the creator
- Amir Hossein Hosseinzadeh (born 2000), Iranian footballer
- Mohammad Reza Hosseinzadeh (born 1964), Iranian economist and banker
- Mohammad-Ali Hosseinzadeh (1977–2016), Iranian principlist
- Mahammadali Huseinzadeh (1823–1852), first shia Sheikh ul-Islam of the Caucasus
- Mehdi Huseynzade (1918–1944), Soviet guerilla of Azerbaijani origin
- Sabir Gusein-Zade (born 1950), Russian mathematician
- Tofig Huseynzade (1946–2006), Azerbaijani philologist, folklorist, journalist and poet

== See also ==
- Huseynov
