= Zadie =

Zadie, Zadeh, Zade, Zadi, Zady, may refer to:

== Places ==
- Zadié (department), Gabon
- Zadié River, Gabon
- Zady, Drohobych Raion, Lviv Oblast, Ukraine
- Zadeh, Iran

== People ==
- Caleb Zady (born 1999), Ivorian footballer
- Guillaume Dah Zadi (born 1978), Ivorian former footballer
- Jean-Pascal Zadi (born 1980), French director, actor and rapper
- Caleb Zady Sery (born 1999; also known as Caleb Zady), Ivorian soccer player
- Zadi Diaz, American director, producer and podcaster
- Zadie Smith (born 1975), English writer
- Zadie Xa (born 1983), Korean-Canadian visual artist
- Zadeh, a Persian name
- Zade, a Persian name

== Other uses ==
- Zadi or Zada (suffix), a Persian and Azerbaijani suffix used as part of titles or nicknames for members of royalty
- Zadie, a Groovy Girls doll
- Zadie, a Work It Out Wombats! character

== See also ==
- Zaddy
- Zaidi (disambiguation)
