= Quezada =

Quezada is a Spanish/Moorish surname. Notable people with the surname include:

- Alejandro Quezada (born 1975), Dominican baseball player
- Ana Quezada, American politician
- Benigno Quezada Naranjo (born 1962), Mexican politician
- Benjamín Medrano Quezada (born 1966), Mexican politician
- Federico Ortiz Quezada (born 1935), Mexican physician
- Flavio Quezada (born 1986), Chilean lawyer, academic and politician
- Humberto Andrade Quezada (born 1955), Mexican politician
- Josefina Quezada (circa 1925–2012), Mexican artist
- Juan Quezada Celado (1940–2022), Mexican potter
- Manny Quezada (born 1985), Brazilian basketball player
- Manuel Quezada (born 1977), American boxer
- Martín Quezada (born 1978), American politician
- Milly Quezada (born 1955), Dominican singer
- Nathalie Quezada (born 1989), Chilean football player
- Rodolfo Quezada Toruño (1932–2012), Guatemalan cardinal
- Roberto A. Quezada (born 1959), American filmmaker
- Steven Michael Quezada (born 1963), American actor
- Yuniesky Quezada (born 1984), Cuban chess player

== See also ==
- Quesada (disambiguation)
