= Quesada =

Quesada may refer to:

== People ==
- Quesada (surname)

== Places ==
- Quesada, Spain, a town in the province of Jaén, in Andalusia
- Ciudad Quesada, Alicante, a town in the province of Alicante, in Valencia, Spain
- Quesada, Costa Rica, a city and district in the canton of San Carlos in the province of Alajuela
- Quesada, Guatemala, a municipality

== Other ==
- Quesada (cicada), an insect genus in the family Cicadidae
- Quesada pasiega, a typical dessert of the Pas valley in Cantabria, Spain; made mainly of fresh cheese, butter, flour and eggs

== See also ==
- de Quesada
- Quezada
