= List of family name affixes =

Family name affixes are a clue for surname etymology and can sometimes determine the ethnic origin of a person. This is a partial list of affixes.

== Prefixes ==
=== Arabic ===
- Abu – (Arabic) "father of";
- Al – (Arabic) "Family of" or "House of" (in conjunction with name of ancestor)
- Bet – (Arabic from "Beyt") "house of"
- Bint – (Arabic) "daughter of"; Binti, Binte (Malaysian version)
- El – (Arabic see Al)
- Ibn – (Arabic) "son of"

=== Armenian ===
- Ter – (Eastern Armenian) "son/daughter of a Priest"
- Der – (Western Armenian) "son/daughter of a priest"; (German) "the" (masculine nominative), "of the" (feminine genitive)

=== Berber ===
- Ayt/At/Ag/Id u- – (Berber) "of"
- At/n Ath – (Berber) "(son[s]) of"
- U - (Berber) "son of"/"descendent of"
- Ult - (Berber) "daughter of"

=== Dutch ===
- de – (Dutch) "the"
- 's – (Dutch) "of the"; contraction of des, genitive case of the definite article de. Example: 's Gravesande.
- 't – (Dutch) "the"; contraction of the neuter definite article het.
- ter – (Dutch) "at the"
- van – (Dutch) "of", "from"
- van de, van den, van der, van 't – (Dutch) "of the", "from the"

=== French ===
"of", "of the", "from"; often a sign of nobility or old bourgeois family, but also just a geographical term of the name originated of a location :

- d'
- de
- de La
- des
- du

=== German ===
- von – (German) "of", "from"; often a sign of nobility, but also just a geographical term if the name originated from a location.
- zu - (German) "at"; a sign of nobility, sometimes in the combination von und zu, meaning the noble family still owns the place of naming

=== Hebrew ===
- Bath, bat – (Hebrew) "daughter of"
- Ben, bin, ibn – (Arabic and Hebrew) "son of"

=== Irish ===
- Mac, Mag – (Irish) "son of". Mac is sometimes written M^{ac} (with superscript ac).
- Nic , Nig – (Irish) "daughter of", from Irish "iníon" meaning "daughter"
- Ó, Ua – (Irish) "grandson of", (male) "descendant of"
- Ní – (Irish) "granddaughter of", (female) "descendant of"
- Uí – (Irish) "descendants of", "wife of a descendant of".
- de – (Irish) "of". Irish names with this prefix are usually of Norman origin.

=== Italian ===
- Del – (Italian, Spanish) "of the", preceding a masculine singular noun
- Degli – (Italian) "of the", preceding a masculine plural noun starting with either sp, sc, ps, z, gn, or st.
- Della – (Italian) "of the", preceding a feminine singular noun
- Di, De – (Italian) "of"

=== Romanian ===
- A – (Romanian) "son of"

=== Welsh ===
- Ab – (Welsh, Cornish, Breton) "son of"
- Ap – (Welsh) "son of"
- Ferch, Verch – (Welsh) "daughter of"
- Verch, Erch – (Welsh) "daughter of"

=== Other ===
- Af – (Danish, Swedish), Av (Norwegian) "of"
- Ālam/Olam – Persian — "world"
- Bar – (Aramaic) "son of"
- Chaudhary - (Punjabi) A title of honour from the Punjab used by several Punjabi tribes, often represented by the prefix "Ch".
- Da – (Italian) "from", "of"; (Portuguese) "from the" (before a feminine singular noun)
- Das – (Portuguese) "from the", "of the", preceding a feminine plural noun.
- De – (Italian, French, Spanish, Portuguese, Filipino) "of"; indicates region of origin, often a sign of nobility; in Spanish-speaking countries a married woman will sometimes append her name with "de XXXX" where "XXXX" is her husband's last name; (Dutch) "the"
- Dele – Southern French, Filipino, and Occitan, equivalent of Du
- Dos – (Portuguese) "from the, of the", preceding a masculine plural noun
- Du – (French) "of the", preceding a masculine singular noun
- E – (Portuguese) "and", between surnames (Maria Eduarda de Canto e Mello)
- Fitz – (Irish, from Norman French) "son of", from Latin "filius" meaning "son" (mistakenly thought to mean illegitimate son, because of its use for certain illegitimate sons of English kings)
- i – (Catalan) "and", always in lowercase, used to identify both surnames (e.g. Antoni Gaudí i Cornet)
- ka – (Zulu) "(son/daughter) of", always in lower case and preceding the name of the father.
- Kil, Gil, Mal, Mul – (English, Irish, Scottish) "son of", "servant of", "devotee of", originating from the Irish "Mac Giolla", typically followed by a Saint's name (e.g. Mac Giolla Bhríde).
- La – (Italian, French, Spanish) "the", feminine singular
- Le – (Northern French) "the", masculine singular
- M'/Mac/Mc/Mck/Mhic/Mic – (Irish, Scottish, and Manx Gaelic) "son". Both Mac and Mc are sometimes written M^{ac} and M^{c} (with superscript ac or c). In some names, Mc is pronounced Mac.
- Mala – (Kurdish) "House of"
- Na – ณ (Thai) "at"
- Ngā – (Te Reo Māori) "the (plural)"
- Nic, Ní – (Irish, Scottish) "daughter of", from Irish "iníon" meaning "daughter"
- Nin – (Serbian)
- O/Ó/Ua/Uí – (Irish, Scottish, and Manx Gaelic) "son of", "grandson of", "descendant of"
- Öz – (Turkish) "pure"
- Pour – (Persian) "son of"
- Te – (Te Reo Māori) "the (singular)"
- Tre – (Cornish) "settlement/ homestead farm of"

== Suffixes ==
- -a, -ya Kurdish means "of" (female) (by two surnames)
- -à (Catalan) feminine -ana "of or from [a locality or place]" (Català -Catalan); and also the name of a job (Manyà -ironsmith), from Latin -ānus, -āna
- -ac (Croatian, Serbian, Slovene, Southern French)
- -ach (Ukrainian, Belarusian /Belarusian Latin: -ač/)
  - -acz (Polish)
- -aei (Persian) (See -i) for words that end in the long vowel A
- -aitis (Lithuanian) "son of"
  - -aitė (Lithuanian) signifies an unmarried female
    - -aty Americanized form
- -aj (Albanian) (pronounced AY; meaning “of the") It denotes the name of the family, which mostly comes from the male founder of the family, but also from a place, as in, Lash-aj (from the village Lashaj of Kastrat, MM, Shkodër). It is likely that its ancient form, still found in MM, was an [i] in front of the last name, as in ‘Déda i Lékajve’ (Déd of Lekës). For ease of use, the [i] in front of the last name, and the ending _ve, were dropped. If the last name ends in [a], then removing the [j] would give the name of the patriarch or the place, as in, Grudaj - j = Gruda (place in MM). Otherwise, removing the whole ending [aj] yields the name of founder or place of origin, as in Lekaj - aj = Lek(ë). Since the names are found most commonly in Malsi e Madhe (North) and Labëri (South), it is likely that this linguistic feature is very old. It must have been lost as a result of foreign influences brought into Albania by the invaders. In the declension of South Slavic demonstrative adjectives/pronouns, the syllable -aj appears specifically in the nominative masculine singular form to indicate spatial relationships: Ov-aj (this one, close to the speaker) T-aj (that one, close to the listener or neutral) On-aj (that one over there, distant from both) Some statement that is supported by Alexander.
- -ak (Polish, Ukrainian, Belarusian, Croatian, Slovene, Slovak, Montenegrin, Sorbian) See -ák for its Slovak meaning.
  - -ák (Czech, Slovak) In Slovak, -ák means "pertaining to" or merely creates a noun, and its two other versions are -iak and -ak.
- -al (Nepali) denotes for village of origin (for e.g.; Khanal, Dhakal, Dahal, Rijal, etc.)
- -an (Ukrainian, Belarusian, Slovene) (e.g. Ruban)
- -an (Romanian)
- -án (Spanish)
- -and (French)
- -ange (French) from Germanic -ing
- -ani (Sindhi) "descended from"
- -ano (Italian) feminine -ana "of or from [a locality]"; from Latin -ānus, -āna
- -ant (English; Norman)
- -ant (French; Old French)
- -ant (Hindi; Sanskrit)
- -anu (Romanian)
- -appa (Kodava) patronymic, meaning "father"
- -ár (Slovak)
- -ář (Czech)
- -arz (Polish)
- -as (French) Duras, Porras, Dumas
- -au (-aw) (Belarusian) / -aŭ (Belarusian Latin).
  - -ava (Belarusian) feminine equivalent of -au
- -au (German) in a toponymic surname, "of or from a lower place near water"
- -auskas/-iauskas (Lithuanian) equivalent to Polish -owski, -ewski, Belarusian -ouski, -euski / Belarusian Latin -oŭski, -eŭski
- -awan (Urdu)
- -ba (Abkhazian) "male"
- -chi, -çı, -çi, cı, -ci (Azeri, Persian, چی-, Turkish) attributed to a geographic location or performing a certain job
- -chian (Persian, چیان-) attributed to or performing a certain job
- -chek, -chik, -chyk, -chuk (Ukrainian, Belarusian /Belarusian Latin: -ček, -čyk, -čuk/) diminutive
  - -czek, -czyk, -czuk, -czak (Polish)
  - -ček, -čík (Czech, Slovak, Slovene)
  - -ćek, -cek (Croatian)
- -ckas (Lithuanian) Lithuanianized version of the Polish and Belarusian -cki
- -cki (Polish, Belarusian, Croatian, Serbian, Sorbian) variant of -ski
  - -cka (Polish, Belarusian, Ukrainian, Sorbian) Feminine equivalent of -cki
- -ckis (Latvian) Latvianized version of the Polish and Belarusian -cki
- -cký (Czech, Slovak)
  - -cká (Czech, Slovak) Feminine equivalent of -cký
- -čki (Serbian, Croatian, Bulgarian)
- -cock, -cox (English) "little"
- -dan, -den, -don, -dön (Kyrghyz) "from (whom)", when the ancestor 's name ends in a soft consonant also vowel (e.g. Asanbaydan, Marlenden, Ormondon, Bayköldön)
- -datter (Danish, Norwegian) "daughter (of)"
- -din (Swedish)
- -dokht (Persian) "daughter (of)"
- -dotter (Norwegian, Swedish) "daughter (of)"
- -dóttir (Icelandic) "daughter (of)" (patronymic suffix (sometimes matronymic) (by law) of not a family name but part of the Icelandic last name where (usually) the father's name is always slightly modified and then dóttir added)
- -dze (Georgian) "son of"
- -dzki (Polish) variant of -ski, -cki
- -é (Catalan)
- -ê, -yê (Kurdish) means "of" (male) (by two surnames)
- -eanu (Romanian)
- -eau, -eault (French) diminutive suffix (Latin -ellu-)
- -ec (Czech, Slovak, Croatian, Slovene, Polish, Sorbian, Ukrainian, Belarusian), (French spelling for Breton -e.g.)
  - -avec (Belarusian)
- -ech (French)
- -ee (See -i)
- -eff (Russian, Bulgarian) obsolete, copied from German transliteration of -ev
- -eiro (Portuguese, Galician)
- -eix (French), diminutive
- -ek (Czech, Polish, Slovak, Slovene, Croatian) diminutive
- -ell (English spelling for French -el, diminutive)
- -el (Northern French and Occitan, French -eau)
- -ema (Suffix of Frisian origin, given by Napoleon Bonaparte who used suffixes like these to keep a record of people's origins within the Netherlands)
- -ems (Dutch)
- -ėnas (Lithuanian) "son of"
- -enko (Ukrainian), -enka/-anka (Belarusian) "son of"
  - -chenko (Ukrainian), -chenka/-chanka (Belarusian /Belarusian Latin: -čenka, -čanka/)
- -ens (Dutch)
- -ent (French)
- -enya (Belarusian /Belarusian Latin: -enia/) (e.g. Gerasimenya)
- -er (Dutch, English, French, German, Turkish "male")
- -ero (Spanish)
- -ers (Dutch)
- -es (Greek, Portuguese) "son of" in Portuguese
- -ese (Italian) plural -esi "of or from [a locality]"; from Latin -ēnsis
- -escu (Romanian) "son of"
- -ești (Romanian) possessive plural, also used in place names
- -et (French) (diminutive suffix Latin -ettu- or former -el)
- -ets (Ukrainian, Belarusian)
- -eu (-ew) (Belarusian /Belarusian Latin: -eŭ/) equivalent to Russian -ev
- -ev (Russian (all Eastern Slavic languages), Bulgarian, Macedonian) possessive
  - -eva (Russian (all Eastern Slavic languages), Bulgarian, Macedonian) Feminine equivalent of -ev
- -evski (Macedonian, Bulgarian) possessive
  - -evska (Macedonian, Bulgarian) Feminine equivalent of -evski
- -ez (Spanish, North Picard) including Spanish-speaking countries "son of"; in Picard, old spelling for -et
- -ëz (Albanian) for feminine; a word refer to something smaller, either literally or figuratively as in a form of endearment
- -fia, -fi, -fy, -ffy (Hungarian) "descendant of" (literally "son of")
- -fleth, -felth, -fleet (Northern German) current, body of water
- -gaard, -gård (Danish, Norwegian, Swedish) farm
- -gil, (Turkish, "family") (e.g. Korkmazgil)
- -i (Hungarian) "of", "from" indicates region of origin, sign of nobility (e.g. "Szentiványi", "Rákóczi"). Like German Von.
- -i (Arabic, Persian, Hebrew) "descendant of", "attributed to" (e.g. "Baghdadi", "Abbasi") or, (Iranian) "from" (e.g. "Barzani" from Barzan, or Tabrizi from Tabriz.)
- -ia (Abkhaz, Mingrelian)
- -ian(ts), -yan(ts), -jian, -gian, -ents, -ants, -unts, -uni (Armenian, Persian) "son/daughter of"
- -iak (Ukrainian, Belarusian, Polish) "descendant of". In Slovak, -iak is a version of -ák/-ak and means "pertaining to" or merely creates a noun.
- -ic(k) (French), misspelling for Breton -ig, diminutive
- -ich (-ovich/-evich) (Belarusian /Belarusian Latin: -ič, –ovič, -evič/), -ych (-ovych/-evych) (Ukrainian) "son of"
  - -icz (-owicz/-ewicz) (Polish) "son of"
  - -ic (Polish, Slovak, Czech, Sorbian, Belarusian, Slovene) "son of"
    - -owic/-ewic (Polish)
    - -ovic (Slovak, Czech [rarely])
    - -ojc/-ejc, -ojic/-ejic (Sorbian)
    - -yc (Belarusian, Sorbian, Polish)
- -ić (-ović/-ević) (Serbian, Croatian, Bosnian, Montenegrin) diminutive possessive, little son of
  - -begović (Bosniak) diminutive possessive of a beg, i.e. chieftain's or chief's little son
  - -ici (-ovici/-evici) Romanian of Slavic origin (Romanian adaptation of -ić or -ich/-ych)
- -ič (-ovič) (Slovene, Slovak, Czech [rarely]) diminutive, "son of"
- -ičius (Lithuanian) Lithuanianized version of the Belarusian -ich (Belarusian Latin: -ič) and Polish -icz
  - -avičius/-evičius (Lithuanian) Lithuanianized version of the Belarusian -ovich/-evich (Belarusian Latin: -ovič/-evič) and Polish -owicz/-ewicz
- -ičs (Latvian) Latvianized version of the Belarusian -ich (Belarusian Latin: -ič) and Polish -icz
  - -ovičs/-evičs (Latvian) Latvianized version of the Belarusian -ovich/-evich (Belarusian Latin: -ovič/-evič) and Polish -owicz/-ewicz
- -ides, -idis, -idas (Greek), "son of"
- -ier (French)
- -ik (Belarusian, Polish, Croatian, Czech, Slovak, Slovene) It merely creates a noun in Slovak where -ik is a version of -ík, can be endearment, diminutive, have other meanings.
  - -ík (Slovak) It merely creates a noun and can also be endearment, diminutive, have other meanings; its other Slovak version is -ik.
- -ik (Estonian) if it follows a tree name, has a meaning "grove"
- -ikh, -ykh (Russian)
- -in (Russian (all Eastern Slavic languages), Bulgarian) possessive
  - -ina (female equivalent of -in; especially rare for male names, but the suffix alone is an actual female name)
  - -yn (Russian, Belarusian, Ukrainian) possessive
- -in (French) diminutive
- -in (Dutch, German) suffix attached to old Germanic female surnames (e.g. female surname "Mayerin", the wife of "Mayer")
- -ge (Sinhalese) "From the house of"
- -ing, ink (Anglo-Saxon, Dutch, German) "descendant"
- -ino (a common suffix for male Latino and Italian names)
- -ipa (Abkhazian) "son of"
- -ipha (Abkhazian) "girl of"
- -is (Greek, /male/ Lithuanian)
  - -ienė (Lithuanian) female version
  - -ytė (Lithuanian) unmarried female version
- -ishin, -yshyn (Ukrainian) possessive (e.g. Romanishin = son of wife of Roman)
  - -ishina, -yshyna (female equivalent of -ishin, -yshyn)
- -iu (Romanian)
- -ius (Lithuanian) "son of"
- -iv (Ukrainian) possessive.
- -iz (Spanish) including Spanish-speaking countries "son of", very unfrequent compared to -ez (Muñiz < Muño)
- -j (Adygean)"old"
- -ja (Sindhi, Punjabi) "from, of", often denoting ancestral hometowns and villages. Mostly with the combinations -ija, -uja and -eja (eg. Makhija, Ahuja, Taneja)
- -jerhin/-jerin (Kyrghyz) "place (of origin)" Usually, this form of the surname is assigned to kairylmans who do not have a surname. This form is added to the place of residence, origin. Those who do not know their origin can also be used. It is possible at will. (e.g. Pamirjerhin/Pamirjerin, Tongjerhin/Tongjerin). In The Kyrghyz latine alphabet will be -zerin
- -ka (Belarusian, Polish, Czech, Slovak) diminutive
- -kan, -ken (Turkish) (e.g. Vuruşkan)
- -kar (Marathi) (e.g. Tendulkar)"originating from",
- -ke (German) "small"
- -ke (Italian, Russian) In surnames of Slavic origin. Like Ukrainian -ko
- -kin, -kins, -ken (English) "little"
- -kin (Dutch) "little"
- -ko (Ukrainian, Polish, Slovak, Czech) diminutive
- -ko (Polish, Czech, Slovak, Bulgarian, Russian, Ukrainian, Belarusian, Serbian, Slovene)- diminutive, “child,” “descendant of.” It is used in affectionate forms of first names, and is also a common suffix in many surnames.
- -ko (Adygean) "son" ĸъо
- -kus (Lithuanian)
- -kvist, -qvist (Swedish) "twig"
- -kyzy (Kazakh) "daughter of"
- -kyzy (Kyrghyz) "daughter of" (but usually used for patronymic)
- -la, -lä (Finnish)
- -le, -lein (German) "small"
- -li, -lı, -lu, -lü (Turkish, Azeri) "from" (e.g. İzmirli, Ankaralı, İstanbullu, Bakülü)
- -li (Italian)
- -lin (French, Irish, Swedish) in Germanic names "small"
- -litz (German)
- -loo, -lou (Persian) "from" (e.g. Ghassemlou, Aghdashloo)
- -man(n) (Dutch, German, English)
- -mand (Persian, مند-) owning or showing
- -maz (Turkish) "does not" (e.g. "Yılmaz = Yields not", "Korkmaz = Fears not")
- -men, -man (Turkish) flipping suffix (e.g. ak=white, akman=purely white), "person", "male person", have other meanings
- -ment (French) from Germanic “man”
- -mere (Old English) meaning “lake”
- -mil (Galician) rothic dissimilation from Suevian anthropotoponymic origin (Ramil (surname) < Ramil (place) < [villa] Ramiri); non dissimilation would be -mir
- -moar
- -mohr (German)
- -moor
- -moore
- -more
- -mor
- -nė, -te /female/ (Lithuanian)
- -nen (Finnish) diminutive, "from"
- -nik (Estonian) attributed to occupation (talu being "farm" – talunik being "farmer")
- -nova, -novas (Italian, Galician, Catalan) "new"
- -novo (Galician) "new"
- -ný (Czech, Slovak) adjective
- -ny (Polish) adjective
- -nezhad, -nejad, -nejhad (Persian, نژاد) "descendant of"
- -nyi (Hungarian)
- -off (Russian, Bulgarian) obsolete, copied from French transliteration of -ov, based on Muscovite pronunciation
- -oğlu (Azeri, Turkish) "son of" (e.g. Türkoğlu)
- -ok (Belarusian, Ukrainian, Czech)
- -ois, -oy, -ais, -ay (French) from Germanic -isk and Vulgar Latin -ese
- -on (French), former subject case in masculine names
- -onak (-onok) (Belarusian)
- -onis (Lithuanian) "son of"
- -os (Greek) like Latin -us (Gasconic, Spanish, Portuguese) from Latin -us
  - -opoulos, -opulos (Greek)
- -osz, -oš (Polish, Czech, Slovak)
- -ot (French) "little"
- -ou(t) (French), various origins
- -ou (Greek) "daughter of"
- -ou (-ow) (Belarusian) / -oŭ (Belarusian Latin) equivalent to Russian -ov
  - -ova (Belarusian) feminine equivalent of -ou
- -ouf (French), French spelling of Arabic names ending with -ūf
- -ouf, Norman-French spelling of surnames of Anglo-Scandinavian origin or West Germanic origin ending with -ulf or -wulf
- -oui (French), French spelling of Arabic names, English spelling -wi
- -ous
- -ov (all Eastern Slavic languages, Bulgarian, Macedonian) possessive
  - -ova (all Eastern Slavic languages, Bulgarian, Macedonian) feminine equivalent of -ov, -ou, -ow
- -ová (Czech, Slovak) feminine derivative of a noun male surname
- -ovo (Russian) (e.g. Durnovo)
- -ovski (Macedonian, Bulgarian) possessive
  - -ovska (Macedonian, Bulgarian) Feminine equivalent of -ovski
- -ow (Russian, though found in predominantly German names, it is pronounced like English "ow" not like the German "ov")
- -pour, -poor (Persian) "son of"
- -putra (Indonesian) "son"
- -putri (Indonesian) "daughter"
- -quin, (French) from Dutch -kin "little"
- -rís (Galician) in seseo areas from Suevian anthropotoponymic origin (Reirís < Reirís (place) < [villa] Reirici; Sabarís; Romarís)
- -riz (Galician) in non-seseo areas from Suevian anthropotoponymic origin (Reiriz (surname) < Reiriz (place) < [villa] Reirici)
- -s (English, Dutch, Irish, Welsh) "(son/daughter) of". Sometimes less recognizable, like in "Hendrickx" (son/daughter of Hendrik)
- -sen or -zen (Danish, Norwegian, Dutch or Low German) "son (of)"
  - -ssen (Dutch or Low German) "son (of)"
  - -ssens or -sens (Dutch) "grandson/granddaughter of". Literally "(son/daughter) of the son of"
- -shvili (Georgian) "child"
- -skas (Lithuanian) Lithuanianized version of the Polish and Belarusian -ski
- -ski (Polish, Belarusian, Macedonian, Bulgarian, Sorbian, Croatian. Also Russian but more often transliterated as -sky), "originating from", "estate of"
  - -ska (Polish, Belarusian, Ukrainian, Macedonian, Bulgarian, Sorbian, Croatian) Feminine equivalent of -ski
- -skiy/-tskiy, -skyi/-tskyi (Ukrainian)
  - -ivskiy, -ivskyi (Ukrainian)
- -skoy/-tskoy (Russian) (e.g. Shakhovskoy)
- -sky/-tsky (Russian, Ukrainian)
  - -skaya/-tskaya (Russian) Feminine equivalent of -sky/-tsky
  - -ivsky (Ukrainian)
- -ský (Czech, Slovak) "originating from", "lord of"
  - -ská (Czech, Slovak) Feminine equivalent of -ský
- -skis (Latvian) Latvianized version of the Polish and Belarusian -ski
- -sma (Frisian) "son of"
- -son (Northern English, Swedish, German, Norwegian, Lowland Scottish, Icelandic) "son (of)" (sometimes less recognizable, e.g. "Dixon"; in Iceland not part of a family name but the patronymic (sometimes matronymic) last name (by law), where (usually) the fathers's name is always slightly modified and then son added)
  - -sson (Icelandic, Norwegian, Swedish, Scottish) "son (of)" (in Iceland technically the first s is a separate "suffix" of the father's name according to Icelandic language rules, one of the most common modifications)
- -(s)son (French), diminutive
- -stad (Norwegian) "town"
- -stein (German) "stone"
- -strom, -strøm, -ström (Danish, Swedish) from 'current', probably an arbitrarily adopted ornamental name but possibly a topographic name for someone who lived by a river.
- -tæ (Ossetian) "belong to"
- -tabar (Persian) "descendant of"
- -tan, -ten, -ton, -tön (Kyrghyz) "from (whom)", when the ancestor 's name ends in a hard consonant (e.g. Syrghaktan, Barsbekten, Bolotton, Küchlüktön)
- -teghin (Kyrghyz) "family tree, descent from the ancestor of the same name", is added at the end to the name of one ancestor. (e.g. Esenteghin, Alymbekteghin, Üsönaalyteghin) Marriage form for the surname -teghinghe — "Belonging to this family tree" (e.g. Esenteghinghe, Alymbekteghinghe, Üsönaalyteghinghe)
- -tō, -dō (Japanese) "from Fujiwara clan"
- -tzki, -tzky (Polish) – phonetic Germanized spelling of original Polish -cki
- -uulu (Kyrghyz) - "son of" (but usually used for patronymic)
- -uk (Ukrainian, Belarusian) diminutive
- -ulea (Romanian) "son of"
- -ulis (Lithuanian)
- -uly (Kazakh form of -uulu) "son of"
- -ūnas (Lithuanian) "son of"
- -vich (Belarusian /Belarusian Latin: -vič/, occasionally a respelling of original Serbian, Croatian -vić) "son of"
  - -vych (Ukrainian)
  - -wicz (Polish), -wic (Polish)
  - -vić (Serbian, Croatian, Bosnian, Montenegrin)
  - -vič (Slovene, Slovak, Czech [rarely]), -vic (Slovak, Czech [rarely])
  - -vici (Romanianized respellings)
  - -vics, -vits (Hungarianized respellings)
  - -vitz, -witz, -witch, -witsch (Germanized or Anglicized respellings)
- -vičius (Lithuanian) Lithuanianized version of the Belarusian -vich (Belarusian Latin: -vič) and Polish -wicz
  - -vičiutė (Lithuanian) signifies an unmarried female
- -vičs (Latvian) Latvianized version of the Belarusian -vich (Belarusian Latin: -vič) and Polish –wicz
- -vedi (Sanskrit, Hindi) "learned in _ Vedas" (e.g. Trivedi = "learned in 3 Vedas")
- -wala, -wallah, wali, vala, vali (Hindustani, Gujarati, Bengali, Marathi) denotes the occupation or place of origin (Occupation example: Batliwala – one who deals with bottles. Place example: Suratwala – one from Surat)
- -wan (Indonesian) denotes a male name
- -war (Marathi), often used to signify members of the Arya Vyshya community, residing in central and western India.
- -wati (Indonesian) denotes a female name
- -wi (Arabic) "from"
- -y (Arabic/Persian) Means descendant of.
- -y (See -i)
- -yal
- -ycz (Polish)
- -yk (Polish, Belarusian, Ukrainian)
- -ynas (Lithuanian) "son of"
- -ys (English) representing i. the archaic plural form, or ii. a diminutive form. Variant forms not limited to -yss, -is, -es. Pronunciation is as modern plural suffix -s; i.e. Sandys = sands; Foulis = fowls.
- -ysz (Polish)
- -za (Kurdish) "born of"
- -zada (Dari (Eastern Persian) and Pashto)
- -zadeh (Turkish, Azeri, Persian زاده)
- -zai (Pashto) "son of", "descendant of"

== See also ==
- Celtic onomastics
- Language identification
- Lists of most common surnames, for the various continents
- Matriname
- Nobiliary particle
- Patronymic surname
- Scandinavian family name etymology
- Slavic name suffix
- Tussenvoegsel (Dutch prefixes)
