= Ahmad Huseinzadeh =

Sheikh ul-Islam Akhund Ahmad Huseinzadeh
- Əhməd Hüseynzadə
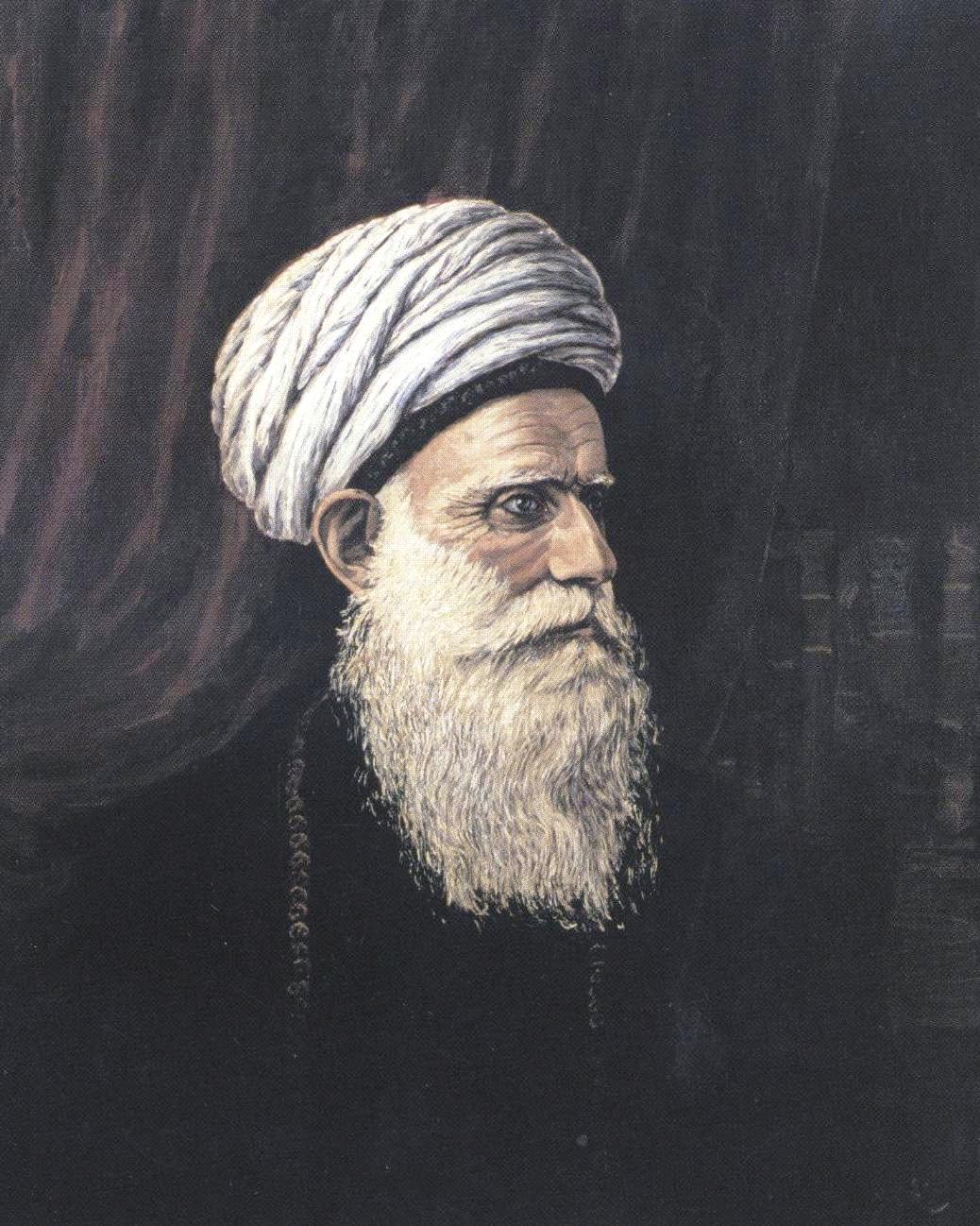
- Portrait by his maternal grandson Ali bey Huseynzade, painted during his studies in Saint Petersburg.
- Title: Third Sheikh ul-Islam of the Caucasus

Personal life
- Born: 1812 Salyan, Shirvan Khanate (present-day Azerbaijan)
- Died: 17 December 1887 (aged 74–75) Tbilisi, Russian Empire (present-day Georgia)
- Spouse: Husniya Khanum
- Children: Khadija Huseynzadeh, Fatima-Bike
- Parent: Muhammad-Ali Huseinzade (father)
- Region: Caucasus
- Main interest(s): Islamic theology, religious education, Arabic sciences, history of Turkic literature, educational reform
- Known for: Leadership of Caucasian Shi'a Muslims, religious and educational writings, advocacy of education in secular sciences and Azerbaijani literary culture
- Relatives: Ali bey Huseynzade (maternal grandson)

Religious life
- Religion: Islam
- Denomination: Shia
- Institute: Transcaucasian Shiite Spiritual Board, Tiflis Muslim Religious School
- School: Usuli
- Jurisprudence: Ja'fari
- Profession: Islamic scholar, Theologian, qadi, teacher, author

Muslim leader
- Teacher: Akhund Molla Muhammad Hussein, Akhund Molla Ramazan
- Based in: Tbilisi, Russian Empire
- Post: Sheikh ul-Islam of the Caucasus, chairman of the Transcaucasian Shiite Spiritual Board
- Predecessor: Fazil Iravani
- Successor: Mirza Hasan Tahirzadeh
- Influenced by: Akhund Molla Muhammad Hussein, Akhund Molla Ramazan
- Awards: Order of St. Anna, 2nd class with Imperial Crown (1871), Order of St. Vladimir, 3rd class (1881)

Ahmad Huseinzadeh (Azerbaijani: Əhməd Hüseynzadə) also known as Sheikh Ahmad Salyani — third Sheikh ul-Islam of the Caucasus, maternal grandfather of Ali bey Huseynzade.

== Early life ==
He was born in Salyan in 1812 to Ali Huseynzadeh. He was brought up initially from 1822 to 1832 in his hometown by his uncle Akhund Molla Muhammad Hussein. Then he became a student of the Baku mujtahid Akhund Molla Ramazan, and studied with him for another six years, until 1838 when he completed the full course of Arabic sciences.

== Career ==
After graduation, he returned to Salyan in 1839 and started teaching various subjects to local children for 6 years. He later gained higher religious education in Najaf and Tbilisi. He was appointed as Sheikh ul-Islam by Alexander II of Russia after Fazil Iravani's resignation with a monthly pension of 1600 rubles on 15 October 1852. He was appointed as head of the Spiritual Council of Transcaucasian Shia Muslims, on 5 April 1875. His deputy was Akhund Mustafa Talibzadeh, father of Abdulla Shaig. He was described as a rather liberal-thinking cleric by Fatali Akhundzadeh and contributed to Akinchi, first Azerbaijani language newspaper. In his letter to Akhundzadeh in 1862, Yousuf Khan Mostashar al-Dowleh said of Huseinzadeh "I don't even consider him a mullah, but rather a spiritual cleric." Like Akhundzadeh, he was a promoter of the Latin alphabet for Azerbaijani and defended the idea that it is not incompatible with Shariah and Islam.

Huseinzadeh also took an interest in Muslim education in the Caucasus. In a 1905 account, his grandson Ali bey Huseynzadeh wrote that, about thirty years earlier, Ahmad had drawn up and submitted to the imperial government a proposal for a religious school to train local mullahs and akhunds. The official staffing schedule for the Transcaucasian Shiite Spiritual Board also assigned the Sheikh ul-Islam duties as inspector of a Muslim school.

He resigned in 1884 and lived in Tbilisi where he died 3 years later.

== Family ==
He was married to the daughter of his uncle Mahammad Ali Huseynzadeh, Husniyya Khanum and had two daughters with her:

1. Fatima Huseinzadeh (b. 1 April 1844, d. 1890) — married to Hajji Muhammad agha, son of Hajji Mirza Hasan in Shamakhi
2. Khadija Huseinzadeh – married to Molla Hussein Huseinzadeh, son of Kazim bey Huseinzadeh of Quruzma
  1. Ali bey Huseynzade
  2. Ismail Huseynzade (1868–1941) — married to his cousin Mina (b. 1878), daughter of Fatima Huseinzadeh, had issues

He studied under his uncle Akhund Molla Muhammad Hussein from 1822 to 1832, then under the Baku Mujtahid Akhund Molla Ramazan, completed a course in Arabic sciences in 1838.

== Works ==
- Muallim-ul atghal fi tarighe-talimi atfal (1875, Tbilisi)
- Basaul nas-fi-mamlakatul Kafkas (Nations of the country of Caucasus, uncompleted work)
- Tarikhi-adabiyyati-Turk (History of Turkic literature)
- Tarbiat-ul-atfal
- Dilgushah

== Awards ==
- Order of St. Anna, 2nd class with Imperial crown (22 September 1871)
- Order of St. Vladimir, 3rd class (30 August 1881)
