= Ali Nagi Huseynov =

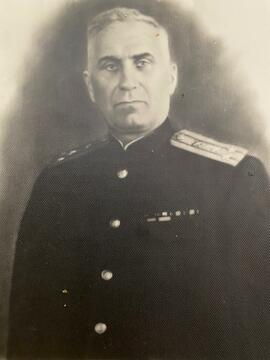
- Native name: Azerbaijani: Əli Nağı Hüseynov
- Born: 5 May 1900; Salyan, Baku Governorate, Russian Empire
- Died: 27.01.1957 Baku, Azerbaijan SSR, USSR
- Allegiance: Azerbaijan Democratic Republic Soviet Union
- Service years: Azerbaijan Democratic Republic 1918 — 1920; Soviet Union 1920 — 1945
- Rank: Colonel
- Commands: 402nd Rifle Division (Soviet Union)
- Conflicts: Winter War; World War II; Battle of the Caucasus
Awards
Order of Lenin	Order of the Red Banner	Order of the Red Banner

Ali Nagi Huseynov (azeri. Əli Nağı Məmmədhəsən oğlu Hüseynov; 5 May 1900 – 27 January 1957) was a Red Army colonel who held divisional command during World War II.

== Life ==
Ali Nagi Mammadhasan oglu Huseynov was born on 5 May 1900 in Salyan, Baku Governorate. From December 1918 until the end of 1919 he was a private of the 4th Quba Regiment of the Armed Forces of the Azerbaijan Democratic Republic. From December 1919 to April 1920 he studied at the cadet school in Ganja, and then until September 1920 at the Baku Unified School. He was appointed as the squadron commander in the 2nd border brigade. Since 1920, he continued to serve in the Red Army.

During the Winter War Ali Nagi Huseynov with the rank of captain commanded a rifle regiment. For the distinguished leadership of the regiment and personal courage, he was awarded the Order of the Red Banner, and also received from Tymoshenko’s hands a personal award weapon - a saber. In 1941 he became a major, commanded a regiment in the 151st Infantry Division on the Western and Central Fronts. He was wounded, left the encirclement and awarded the second Order of the Red Banner.

After his recovery in a hospital he was appointed a commander of the 402nd Azerbaijan Rifle Division in February 1942. On 4 October 1942, the 402nd Rifle Division was transferred to Gudermes, where it became part of the 9th Rifle Corps of the 44th Army of the Northern Group of Forces of the Transcaucasian Front. From 3 October to 27 November 1942, the division defended at the approaches to Grozny on the right bank of the Terek. On the orders of the commander of the 44th Army, Major General Vasily Khomenko, on 30 November 1942, the 402nd Division, in cooperation with the 114th and 416th Rifle Divisions and the 5th Guards Don Cossack Cavalry Corps, went on the offensive in the direction of Sheftovo-Mozdok with aim to defeat the Mozdok group of the enemy and by 12 December to free Mozdok.

During the period from 30 November to 11 December 1942, Units of the 402nd Rifle Division in fierce battles liberated the settlements of Otrashnikovo, Staro-Bukhirovo, Shirkutovskoye, Khokhlatsky, Smirnovka, Poti-Onin, Sborny, Naydenovsky. The fighting was carried out without the support of tanks and with weak artillery support. In December 1942 he was transferred to service in the rear and reserve units, including as part of the 1st Belorussian Front.

At the end of the war A military commander of Charlottenburg district of Berlin, responsible for the restoration of the city, namely the supply of water, light, food products, opening stores. After establishing the order and ending the active phase of the post-war proceedings and determining new tasks, establishing contacts with the civilian population and the new German authorities.

After the end of the war, Huseynov was dismissed from his post for health reasons in July and appointed acting Deputy People's Commissar of Education for Military Training of the Azerbaijan SSR. He was transferred to the reserve due to illness on 14 December 1945. Huseynov died in Baku on 27 January 1957.

== Awards and honors ==
Awards: the Order of Lenin, two Orders of the Red Banner, the Order of the Red Star, the medal "For the Defense of the Caucasus", other medals, and personalized weapons.

A school carries his name and a street in his birth town of Salyan, Azerbaijan.
