= Zaidi =

Zaidi may refer to:

- The Zaidiyyah sect of Islam or Al-Zaidi, its adherents
- Zaidi Imamate or Yemeni Zaidi State, kingdom in Yemen (1597–1849)
- Al-Zaidi, Arab descendants of Zayd ibn Ali
- Zaidi Wasitis, people with the surname Zaidi, South Asian descendants of Zayd ibn Ali, from Wasit, Iraq, followers of Twelver or Athnā‘ashariyyah (Ja'fari jurisprudence)
  - Zaidi Al Wasti, another surname found among the same people
- Yiddish informal title for grandfather

== See also ==
- Zaid (disambiguation)
- Zaidee, given name
- Wasti, descendants of Zayd ibn Ali
- Zadie (disambiguation)
