= De Quesada =

de Quesada is a Spanish surname. Individuals with this surname include:

- Alfredo De Quesada (b. 1976) - actor of Cuban heritage born in Puerto Rico
- Ernesto de Quesada (b. 1886 - d.195?) - Cuban-born impresario, primarily in Europe and Latin America
- Gonzalo de Quesada y Aróstegui (1868–1915) - figure in the Cuban Independence Movement with José Martí
- Gonzalo Jiménez de Quesada (1509–1579) - conquistador in Colombia
- Hernán Pérez de Quesada - conquistador, brother of Gonzalo Jiménez de Quesada
- Ricardo Alarcón de Quesada (b. 1937) - president of National Assembly of People's Power of Cuba as of 1993

== See also ==
- Quesada (disambiguation)
