= Alejandro Díaz =

Alejandro Díaz can refer to:

- Alejandro Díaz (athlete) (1920–2004), Chilean Olympic athlete
- Alejandro Díaz (gymnast) (1924–2002), Cuban Olympic gymnast
- Alejandro Díaz (baseball) (born 1975), Dominican Republic baseball player
- Alejandro Díaz (footballer) (born 1996), Mexican footballer
