= Fazil Iravani =

Azerbaijani jurist (1782–1885)

Ayatollah al-Uzma Fazil Iravani
- Title: Second Sheikh ul-Islam of the Caucasus

Personal life
- Born: 1782 Iravan, Iravan Khanate, Zand Iran
- Died: March 3, 1885 (aged 102–103) Yerevan, Erivan Governorate, Russian Empire

Religious life
- Religion: Islam
- Denomination: Shia
- School: Usuli
- Sect: Twelver
- Jurisprudence: Ja'fari

Muslim leader
- Based in: Tbilisi, Russian Empire
- Post: Sheikh ul-Islam of the Caucasus
- Period in office: 1846-1852
- Predecessor: Mahammadali Huseinzadeh
- Successor: Ahmad Huseinzadeh

Muhammad ibn Muhammad Bagher Iravani (Persian: محمد بن محمدباقر ایروانی) or Fazil Iravani was an Islamic jurist and the second Sheikh ul-Islam of the Caucasus and an Ayatollah al-Uzma.

== Early life and education ==
Fazil Iravani was born in Yerevan in either 1782 or 1817 to Muhammad Baqir Iravani. His grandfather Mir Abdulfattah Iravani was a cleric as well. He got his primary religious education in same city. He went on to continue his education in 1802 to Al-Azhar University. He later went on to be a disciple of Ayatollah Sayyed Ibrahim Qazwini in Karbala and later studied in Najaf. He was also a disciple of Sayyid Husayn Kuhkamara'i, uncle of Muhammad Hujjat Kuh-Kamari. According to Iranian writer Aghighi Bakhshayeshi, he was a successor to Kuhkamara'i and the Turkish faction of Najaf scholars. He later became a marja', having 30 students and disciples of himself, including Sayyid 'Ali Kuhkamara'i, his teacher's brother, Muhammad Hirz al-Din, Abdallah Mazandarani and Sayyed Hussein Khamenei (grandfather of Ali Khamenei). He was akhund of Isfahan and Tabriz in his 40s.

== Sheikh ul-Islam ==
He returned to his native Yerevan in 1827 and became akhund of Blue Mosque. He was appointed as deputy of Sheikh ul-Islam Mahammadali Huseinzadeh in 1843. He succeeded him as Sheikh ul-Islam of the Caucasus prior to former's resignation in 1846. He reformed many clerical issues, including taking nikah rights from mosque mullahs and handing it over to more educated akhunds. He resigned his post in 1852 and was succeeded by Ahmad Huseinzadeh. He died on 3 March 1885, Yerevan in very old age and buried in Najaf.

== Works ==
He was long thought to be the author of famous novel The Rose and the Nightingale (1834), being mistaken for Fazlî Kara, an Ottoman poet. Besides that, he authored at least 15 treatises including Qawaid-i Farsi (1845, Tabriz), Usuli Ibrat.

== Family ==
He had at least 3 children:

1. Sheikh Mahmud Iravani
2. Sheikh Morteza Iravani
3. Sheikh Muhammad Javad Iravani (b. 1870, Najaf - 1962)
  1. Mirza Mohammad Iravani (died young)
  2. Sheikh Kazem Iravani
  3. Sheikh Mohammad Taghi Iravani (b. 1911 - d. 1 November 2005)
    1. Ayatollah Muhammad Baqir al-Irawani (b. 1949, Najaf)
    2. A daughter
      1. Ammar Nakshawani
