= Alizadeh =

Alizadeh (Azerbaijani: Əlizadə; Persian: علیزاده, romanized: 'alizâde) is a surname built from Ali (name) and the Persian suffix zada. Notable people with the surname include:

- Agshin Alizadeh, Azerbaijani composer
- Ali Alizadeh, Iranian footballer
- Firangiz Alizadeh, Azerbaijani composer
- Ghazaleh Alizadeh, Iranian writer
- Hossein Alizadeh, Iranian musician
- Javad Alizadeh, Iranian cartoonist
- Kimia Alizadeh, Iranian Taekwondo athlete
- Safura Alizadeh, Azeri musician
- Sevda Alizadeh, Iranian singer known as Sevdaliza
- Sonita Alizadeh, Afghan rapper and activist

== See also ==
- Matilda Aslizadeh (born 1976), Iranian–born Canadian visual artist
