= Mahammadali Huseinzadeh =

Akhund Muhammad Ali Huseinzadeh
- Title: Sheikh ul-Islam of the Caucasus

Personal life
- Born: 1791 Salyan, Shirvan Khanate (nowadays Azerbaijan)
- Died: April 22, 1852 (aged 60–61) Tbilisi, Russian Empire

Religious life
- Religion: Islam
- School: Shia

Muslim leader
- Based in: Tbilisi, Russian Empire
- Post: Sheikh ul-Islam of the Caucasus
- Period in office: 1823-1846
- Successor: Fazil Iravani

Akhund Mahammadali Huseinzadeh (Azerbaijani: Məhəmməd Əli Hüseynzadə) — first shia Sheikh ul-Islam of the Caucasus from 1823 to 1852. Maternal great-grandfather of Ali bey Huseynzade.

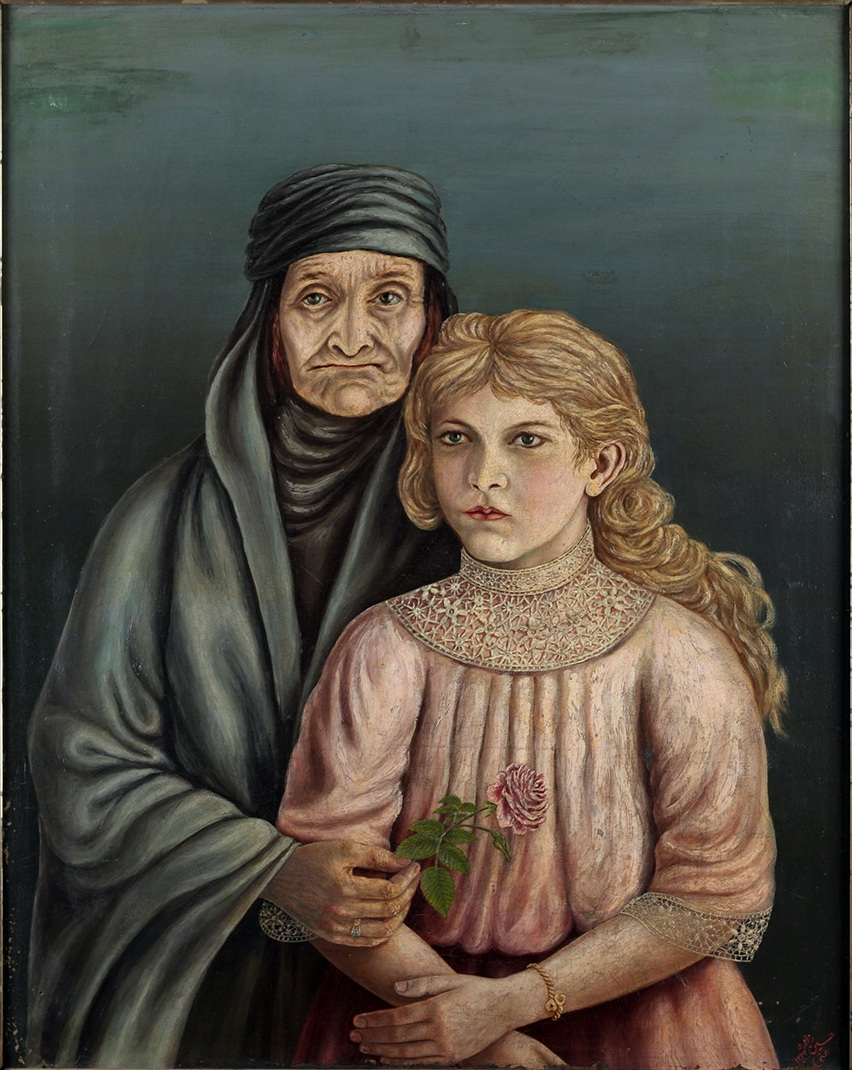
Mahammad Ali's daughter Nisa Huseinzadeh and granddaughter Boyukkhanim, by Ali bey Huseynzade, 1910

== Early life ==
Mahammadali Huseinzadeh was born in Salyan, Shirvan Khanate in 1791. He got his primary religious education in Salyan, Ganja, and later in Baghdad and came to Tbilisi in 1802 where he was appointed as akhund of Shah Abbas Mosque. He was appointed as Sheikh ul-Islam of the Tbilisi in 1822 (or in 1823) and served in this post until 1846. His influence was not wider and only accepted around Tbilisi and Ganja. This influence was mainly decreased after the appointment of Mir-Fatah-Agha as head of the Caucasian Spiritual Assembly in 1828. His main accomplishment was imperial legalization of sharia courts and feudal rights of beys on 6 December 1846 by Nicholas I just days before his resignation. He was succeeded by Fazil Iravani in 1846.

Despite his resignation, he was active in the religious scene and helped to fund a Shiite theological school in Tbilisi on 12 December 1847 with help from Fathali Akhundov and Abbasgulu Bakikhanov. He died on 22 April 1852. His nephew, Ahmad Huseinzadeh also became a sheikh-ul-islam.

== Family ==
He had at least two daughters: Nisa Huseinzadeh, born in 1835, and Husniyya Huseinzadeh, who married her cousin Ahmad Huseinzadeh
