= Huseynov =

Huseynov, Hüseynov, Guseinov, Gusseinov or Guseynov (Azerbaijani: Hüseynov, Russian: Гусейнов) and its female form Huseynova, Guseinova, Gusseinova or Guseynova (Azerbaijani: Hüseynova, Russian: Гусейновa) is an Azerbaijani surname. It is slavicized from the Arabic male given name Hussein. Notable people carrying this name include:

== Guseinov / Guseynov ==
- Aidyn Guseinov (1955–2003), Azerbaijani chess player
- Badavi Guseynov (born 1991), Azerbaijani football player
- Gadir Guseinov (born 1986), Azerbaijani chess grandmaster
- Vadim Gusseinov (born 1968), Kazakhstani ice hockey player

== Huseynov ==
- Elmar Huseynov (1967–2005), independent Azerbaijani journalist, harsh critic of Azerbaijani authorities
- Elmira Hüseynova (1933–1995), Azerbaijani sculptor
- Elnur Hüseynov (born 1987), Azerbaijani pop singer
- Heydar Huseynov (1908–1950), Azerbaijani philosopher and academician
- Hijran Huseynova (born 1955), Azerbaijani politician
- Javid Huseynov (born 1988), Azerbaijani footballer
- Mirza Davud Huseynov (1894–1938), Azerbaijani revolutionary and statesman
- Ramal Huseynov (born 1984), Azerbaijan footballer
- Rovshan Huseynov (born 1975), Azerbaijani amateur boxer
- Vafa Huseynova (born 1988), Azerbaijani gymnast
- Surat Huseynov (1959–2023), Azerbaijani military officer and ex-Prime Minister
- Tymerlan Huseynov (born 1968), Ukrainian sporting director and former football player
- Zelimkhan Huseynov (born 1981), Azerbaijani wrestler
- Zulfiyya Huseynova (born 1970), Azerbaijani judoka

== See also ==
- Huseyn
- Husaynzada
