= Zada (suffix) =

Persian title and name suffix

Zada (Classical Persian: زاده; Dari and Pashto: زاده (zada); Tajik: зода, romanized: zoda) also spelled zadah, is a Persian-language suffix used as part of titles or nicknames for members of royalty, for example: Beg-zada, Beg-zade, or the variant Beg-zadi. (Note: Beg, Baig or Bey is a title in part of Mirza & using royal person) It is also used to form surnames, where it is a phonetically local variant of the Iranian zadeh (meaning "descendant of") - the last name -zada is especially common in Afghanistan. Some prominent Afghans with the suffix as a last name include: Siyar Bahadurzada, Mozhdah Jamalzadah, Khushnood Nabizada, Raheem Ghamzada and Hibatullah Akhundzada. Sometimes the suffix may appear as an individual last name due to the lack of standardized romanization from Dari and Pashto, for example Ramazan Juma Zada. It has also been used in Pakistan and northern India including as other names, prominent examples being Usman Peerzada, Shahzeb Khanzada, Sahibzada Iskandar Ali Mirza and Malikzada Manzoor Ahmad.

== Titles built with -zada ==
=== Beg ===
- Begzada (Begzade) is a part of Beg, son of Beg.
- Begzadi is a part of Beg, daughter of Beg also Beg female use Begum, wife of Baig.

=== Shah ===
- Shahzada (Shahzade or Shehzade) is a part of Shah, son of Shah.
- Shahzadi (Shehzadi) is a part of Shah, daughter of Shah.

=== Sahib ===
- Sahibzada is a part of Shahib or further male descendant; compare Shahzada.

=== Khan ===
- Khanzada (Khanzade) is a part of Khan, son of Khan.
- Khanzadi is a part of Khan, daughter of Khan also Khan female use Khanum, wife of Khan.

=== Nawab ===
- Nawabzada is a part of Nawab, son of Nawab.

== Surnames built with -zada ==
- Alizada
- Husaynzada
- Qulizada
- Wazirzada

== See also ==
- Zadeh, mainly Iranian and Azeri variant
- Mirza, related noble name
- Vand, similar Iranian suffix
- Quezada, unrelated Spanish name with the same suffix
- Family name affixes
