= Posting system =

Baseball player transfers between Japan and the United States

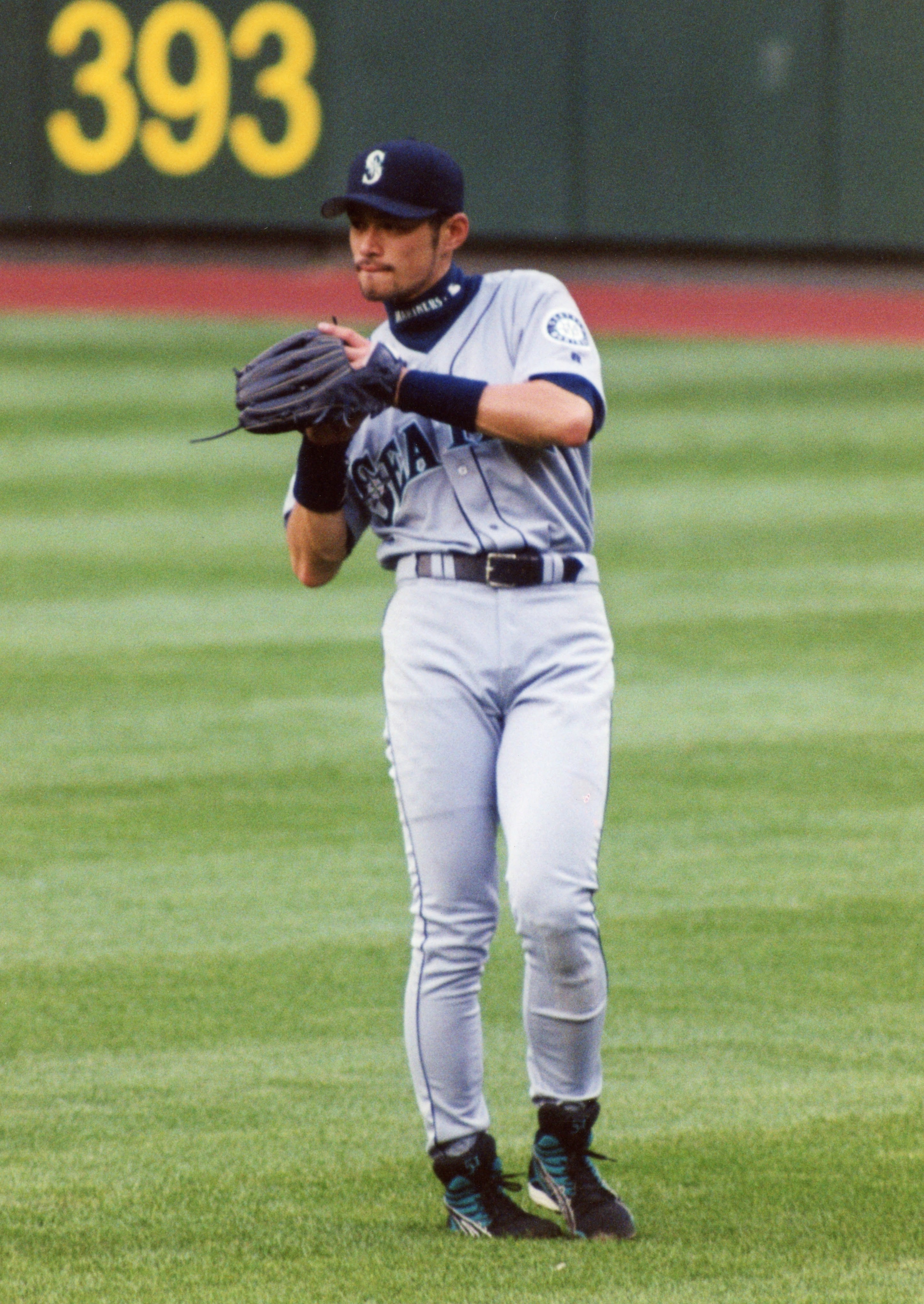
Ichiro Suzuki was the first high-profile NPB player (second overall) to use the posting system.

The posting system (ポスティングシステム, posutingu shisutemu) is a baseball player transfer system that operates between Nippon Professional Baseball (NPB) and Major League Baseball (MLB). Despite the drafting of the United States – Japanese Player Contract Agreement, unveiled in 1967 to regulate NPB players moving to MLB, problems began to arise in the late 1990s. Some NPB teams lost star players without compensation, an issue highlighted when NPB stars Hideo Nomo and Alfonso Soriano left to play in MLB after using loopholes to void their existing contracts. A further problem was that NPB players had very little negotiating power if their teams decided to deal them to MLB, as when pitcher Hideki Irabu was traded to an MLB team for which he had no desire to play. In 1998, the Agreement was rewritten to address both problems; the result was dubbed the "posting system".

Under this system, when an NPB player is "posted", his NPB team notifies the MLB Commissioner, with the posting fee based on the type of contract a player signs and its value. For minor-league contracts, the fee is a flat 25% of the contract's value; for MLB contracts, the fee is based on the value of the contract that the posted player eventually signs. The player is then given 30 days to negotiate with any MLB team willing to pay the NPB team's posting fee. If the player agrees on contract terms with a team before the 30-day period has expired, the NPB team receives the posting fee from the signing MLB team as a transfer fee, and the player is free to play in MLB. If no MLB team comes to a contract agreement with the posted player, then no fee is paid, and the player's rights revert to his NPB team. The current process replaced one in which MLB held a silent auction during which MLB teams submitted sealed, uncapped bids in an attempt to win the exclusive negotiating rights with the posted player for a period of 30 days. Once the highest bidding MLB team was determined, the player could then only negotiate with that team.

Up to the end of the 2017–18 posting period, 23 NPB players had been posted using the system. Of these, 12 signed Major League contracts, four signed minor-league contracts, five were unsuccessful in attracting any MLB interest, and two could not come to a contract agreement during the 30-day negotiation period. The five highest-profile players that have been acquired by MLB teams through the posting system are Ichiro Suzuki, Daisuke Matsuzaka, Yu Darvish, Masahiro Tanaka, and Shohei Ohtani. The first three attracted high bids of $13.125 million, $51.1 million, and $51.7 million respectively. Tanaka was the first player posted under a revised procedure that was in place from 2013 to 2017; he was posted for the maximum $20 million allowed under the new rules. Ohtani was the first player posted under the current procedure; his posting fee of $20 million was grandfathered in under the previous agreement. Since its implementation the posting system has been criticized by the media and baseball insiders from both countries.

== History ==
The first instance of a Japanese-born player playing in Major League Baseball was in 1964, when the Nankai Hawks, an NPB team, sent three exchange prospects to the United States to gain experience in MLB's minor league system. One of the players, pitcher Masanori Murakami, was named the California League Rookie of the Year while playing for the Fresno Giants (the San Francisco Giants' Class-A team). Giants executives were impressed with his talent and on September 1, 1964 Murakami was promoted, thus becoming the first Japanese player to play in MLB. After Murakami put up good pitching statistics as a reliever, Giants executives sought to exercise a clause in their contract with the Hawks that, they claimed, allowed them to buy up an exchange prospect's contract. NPB officials objected, stating that they had no intention of selling Murakami's contract to the Giants and telling them that Murakami was merely on loan for the 1964 season. After a two-month stalemate the Giants eventually agreed to send Murakami back to the Hawks after the 1965 season. Thus, after pitching one more season for the Giants, Murakami returned to Japan to play for the Hawks. This affair led to the 1967 United States – Japanese Player Contract Agreement, also known as the "working agreement", between MLB and NPB, which was basically a hands-off policy.

=== Complications ===
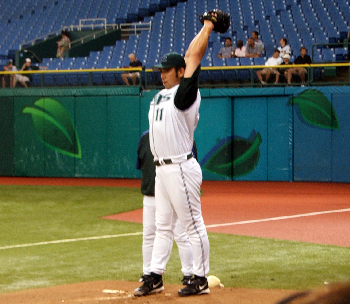
The second Japanese-born player to play in MLB, Hideo Nomo used a loophole to void his NPB contract.

MLB and NPB officials created the posting system as a combined reaction to three cases in the 1990s, involving NPB players who moved to MLB. The first of these occurred in the winter of 1994 when pitcher Hideo Nomo, with the help of agent Don Nomura, became the second Japanese-born player to play in MLB, 30 years after Murakami. Nomo, who was not yet eligible for free agency in Japan, was advised by Nomura that the Japanese Uniform Players Contract's reserve clause limited the Kintetsu Buffaloes' control over him to Japan only. Nomo utilized this loophole by voluntarily retiring from NPB to terminate his contract with the Buffaloes, circumvent its reserve clause and play in MLB. He announced his retirement from NPB in late 1994 and signed with the Los Angeles Dodgers in February 1995, where he won the National League Rookie of the Year award. The following year, the Dodgers signed Nomo to a three-year, $4.3 million contract.

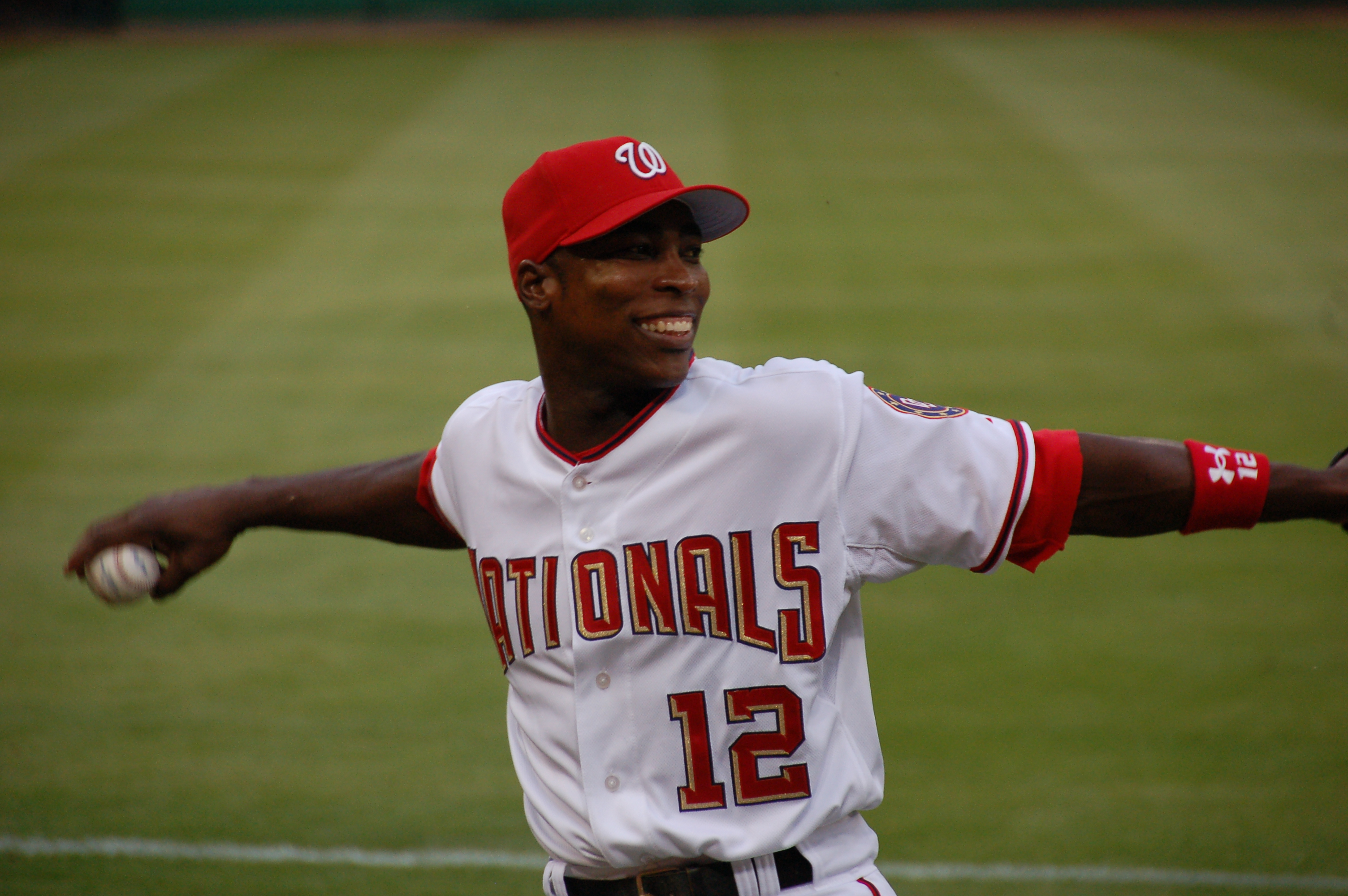
Alfonso Soriano's move to MLB helped prompt the creation of the posting system.

In early 1997, after months of negotiations, the San Diego Padres signed a working agreement with the Chiba Lotte Marines that gave the Padres exclusive signing rights to another Nomura client, Hideki Irabu. Although both Irabu and Nomura stated that Irabu would only sign with the New York Yankees, neither the Padres nor the Marines consulted Irabu before finalizing their deal. The Major League Baseball Players Association (MLBPA) sided with Irabu, stating that the arrangement unfairly disregarded a player's expressed wishes. However, MLB's executive council ruled that the Padres had not violated any existing rule, and therefore legally held the rights to Irabu. Following this decision, Irabu contemplated a number of different options, including playing in NPB until he became a free agent, and taking the matter to the U.S. judicial system. By May, however, the Padres gave in and traded Irabu to the Yankees, who signed him for $12.8 million over four years.

The final incident occurred in 1998, when Alfonso Soriano was unable to leave the Hiroshima Toyo Carp due to contract restrictions. Soriano disliked the intense Japanese practice schedule, and the Carp denied him a salary increase from $45,000 (the league's minimum) to $180,000 per year. Like Nomo and Irabu, Soriano hired Nomura to help his situation. After first attempting to void Soriano's NPB contract by unsuccessfully arguing that the player was legally a minor when he signed it Nomura advised him, like Nomo, to retire from NPB and pursue a career in MLB. This prompted Carp executives to file an injunction against Soriano and send letters to MLB teams demanding that they cease all negotiations with him. NPB officials claimed that after the Nomo case they had privately amended the Player Contract to give NPB teams the right to prohibit a player from signing a new contract anywhere after voluntarily retiring. Since MLB officials were not consulted and they did not agree to any changes, MLB Commissioner Bud Selig declared that MLB would recognize Soriano as a free agent on July 13, 1998, and the Carp backed down. He signed a 5-year, $3.1 million contract with the New York Yankees the same year.

=== Resolution ===
In 1998, Orix BlueWave general manager Shigeyoshi Ino rewrote the 1967 United States – Japanese Player Contract Agreement, when he drafted the "posting system". Selig and NPB Commissioner Hiromori Kawashima signed this new agreement in December 1998. It sought to address each of the problems brought up by the Nomo, Irabu and Soriano cases, by requiring MLB teams to place "bids" for NPB players. These bids became the basis of transfer fees that are paid as compensation to NPB teams whose star players sign with MLB. NPB players are also allowed to negotiate with MLB teams over the terms of their new contracts. Through the 2013 season, the agreement was in effect on a year-to-year basis, terminable at the option of either the MLB Commissioner or the NPB Commissioner provided notice to terminate is given by June 18 of any given year.

A new agreement between MLB and NPB, with significantly different rules, was announced on December 16, 2013 and took effect immediately; it continued through the 2016 MLB and NPB seasons. It removed the blind auction system, changing the system to allow for negotiations between any team that wished to sign the player, and capping the posting fee at $20 million. The agreement was extended for an additional season during negotiations for a new agreement.

The current posting agreement was reached after the 2017 MLB and NPB seasons. The agreement runs through October 31, 2021, the expiration date of MLB's current collective bargaining agreement. Not all of the provisions applied immediately—for example, the Hokkaido Nippon-Ham Fighters were allowed to set a $20 million posting fee, the maximum allowed under the previous agreement, for two-way star Shohei Ohtani, whom they posted shortly after approval of the new agreement. Since the end of the 2018 NPB and MLB seasons, posting fees have been based on the type of contract a player signs and the deal's value. For players signed to MLB contracts, the posting fee is based on the amount of guaranteed money in the initial contract:

- 20% of the first $25 million
- 17.5% of the next $25 million
- 15% of any amount above $50 million

For players signed to minor-league contracts, the fee is a flat 25% of the contract's value.

The system only applies to players currently under contract with a Japanese team, although players who have nine or more years of playing service with NPB are exempt. It does not apply to free agents or to amateur players who have never played in NPB. Mac Suzuki, Micheal Nakamura, Kazuhito Tadano, and Junichi Tazawa are the only Japanese players to have debuted in MLB without having played in NPB. The system does not work in reverse; it does not regulate MLB players, such as Alex Cabrera, who moved to NPB.

== Process ==
When a player under contract with a Nippon Professional Baseball team wishes to play in Major League Baseball, he must notify his current team's management and request that they make him available for posting during the next posting period (November 1 – March 1 through the 2013 season, and November 1 – February 1 in the current agreement). The NPB team can reject this request, and the player will not be posted. However, if the team consents, the player is presented to the MLB Commissioner, who then notifies all MLB teams of the posted player.

In the original process, MLB held a four-day-long silent auction during which interested MLB teams submitted sealed bids in U.S. dollars to the Commissioner's Office. After the allotted four days passed, the Commissioner closed the bidding process and notified the posted player's NPB team of the highest bid amount but not who the bidding team was. The NPB team then had four days to either accept or reject the non-negotiable bid amount.

If the bid was rejected, the NPB team retained rights to the player. If it was accepted, the successful MLB team was granted the exclusive rights to negotiate with the player for 30 days. If the player and the MLB team agreed on contract terms before the 30-day period expired, the NPB team received the bid amount as a transfer fee within five business days. The player was then free to play for his new MLB team in the coming season. The transfer fee was not included when calculating an MLB team's total payroll, which is subject to a luxury tax when it exceeds $155 million. If the MLB team could not come to a contract agreement with the posted player, then no fee was paid and the rights to the player reverted to his NPB team. A player could request to be posted again in subsequent years, and the process would be repeated with no advantage to the club that had won the bidding the previous year.

Under the current process (2017), the NPB team notifies the MLB Commissioner of a posting, with the posting fee determined by the value of the contract that a posted player eventually signs with an MLB organization. Once the MLB Commissioner announces the posting, the player has 45 days to sign with an MLB team. Unlike the past system, in which only the team that won the bidding process had negotiating rights, the current system allows the posted player to negotiate with any MLB team willing to pay the posting fee. As in the previous process, if the player signs with an MLB team during the negotiating window, the signing team will pay the posting fee; otherwise, his rights revert to his NPB team. Also mirroring the past system, an unsuccessfully posted player can request a posting in a later year, with the process repeated.

== List of postings ==
Of the 71 Japanese-born players who have played in MLB, 22 have entered the league using the posting system. Since the system's creation in 1998, the 28 players that have used it have experienced a range of success. Of these 28, sixteen were immediately signed to Major League contracts and one player who drew no bids on his first posting was signed to a Major League contract on his second posting. These contracts range from $1.4 million to $155 million. Of the remaining twelve, four were signed to Minor League contracts, three were unable to reach a contract agreement and six were unsuccessful in drawing bids from any Major League clubs (one player failed to draw bids during two separate postings). The following tables outline each posting and its outcome.

Successful postings
Player	Posting date	NPB team	MLB team	Winning bid or posting fee	Date of contract agreement	MLB contract	Notes
Alejandro Díaz	February 2, 1999	Hiroshima Toyo Carp	Cincinnati Reds	$400,001	March 2, 1999	Minor league contract	
Ichiro Suzuki	November 9, 2000	Orix BlueWave	Seattle Mariners	$13,125,000	November 30, 2000	3 years, $14 million	
Kazuhisa Ishii^{P}	January 3, 2002	Yakult Swallows	Los Angeles Dodgers	$11,260,000	February 8, 2002	4 years, $12.3 million	
Ramón Ramírez^{P}	February 6, 2003	Hiroshima Toyo Carp	New York Yankees	$350,000	March 5, 2003	Minor league contract	
Akinori Otsuka^{P}^{§}	November 11, 2003	Chunichi Dragons	San Diego Padres	$300,000	December 9, 2003	2 years, $1.5 million	
Norihiro Nakamura	January 28, 2005	Orix Buffaloes	Los Angeles Dodgers	Undisclosed^{ψ}	February 3, 2005	Minor league contract	
Shinji Mori^{P}	December 12, 2005	Seibu Lions	Tampa Bay Devil Rays	$750,000	November 11, 2006	2 years, $1.4 million	
Daisuke Matsuzaka^{P}	November 2, 2006	Seibu Lions	Boston Red Sox	$51,111,111.11^{†}	December 14, 2006	6 years, $52 million	
Akinori Iwamura	November 6, 2006	Tokyo Yakult Swallows	Tampa Bay Devil Rays	$4,500,000	December 15, 2006	3 years, $7.7 million	
Kei Igawa^{P}	November 17, 2006	Hanshin Tigers	New York Yankees	$26,000,194^{‡}	December 27, 2006	5 years, $20 million	
Tsuyoshi Nishioka	November 17, 2010	Chiba Lotte Marines	Minnesota Twins	$5,329,000	December 17, 2010	3 years, $9 million	
Norichika Aoki	December 12, 2011	Tokyo Yakult Swallows	Milwaukee Brewers	$2,500,000	January 17, 2012	2 years, $2.5 million	
Yu Darvish^{P}	December 8, 2011	Hokkaido Nippon-Ham Fighters	Texas Rangers	$51,703,411^{€}	January 18, 2012	6 years, $60 million	
Masahiro Tanaka^{P}	December 26, 2013	Tohoku Rakuten Golden Eagles	New York Yankees	$20,000,000	January 22, 2014	7 years, $155 million	
Kenta Maeda^{P}	December 10, 2015	Hiroshima Toyo Carp	Los Angeles Dodgers	$20,000,000	January 7, 2016	8 years, $25 million	
Shohei Ohtani^{2W}	December 1, 2017	Hokkaido Nippon-Ham Fighters	Los Angeles Angels	$20,000,000	December 8, 2017	Minor league contract	
Kazuhisa Makita^{P}	December 11, 2017	Saitama Seibu Lions	San Diego Padres	$500,000	January 6, 2018	2 years, $3.8 million	
Yusei Kikuchi^{P}	December 3, 2018	Saitama Seibu Lions	Seattle Mariners	$10,275,000^{µ}	January 2, 2019	4 years, $56 million	
Yoshi Tsutsugo	November 18, 2019	Yokohama DeNA BayStars	Tampa Bay Rays	$2,400,000	December 16, 2019	2 years, $12 million	
Shun Yamaguchi^{P}	December 3, 2019	Yomiuri Giants	Toronto Blue Jays	$1,270,000	December 27, 2019	2 years, $6.35 million	
Kohei Arihara^{P}	November 26, 2020	Hokkaido Nippon-Ham Fighters	Texas Rangers	$1,240,000	December 26, 2020	2 years, $6.2 million	
Seiya Suzuki	November 22, 2021	Hiroshima Toyo Carp	Chicago Cubs	$12,350,000	March 19, 2022	5 years, $85 million	
Masataka Yoshida	December 7, 2022	Orix Buffaloes	Boston Red Sox	$15,375,000	December 15, 2022	5 years, $90 million	
Shintaro Fujinami^{P}	December 1, 2022	Hanshin Tigers	Oakland Athletics	$650,000	January 13, 2023	1 years, $3.25 million	
Yoshinobu Yamamoto^{P}	November 20, 2023	Orix Buffaloes	Los Angeles Dodgers	$50,625,000	December 27, 2023	12 years, $325 million	
Shota Imanaga^{P}	November 27, 2023	Yokohama DeNA BayStars	Chicago Cubs	$9,825,000	January 11, 2024	4 years, $53 million	
Naoyuki Uwasawa^{P}	November 27, 2023	Hokkaido Nippon-Ham Fighters	Tampa Bay Rays	$6,250	January 11, 2024	Minor league contract	
Koyo Aoyagi^{P}	December 3, 2024	Hanshin Tigers	Philadelphia Phillies	TBD	January 17, 2025	Minor league contract	
Roki Sasaki^{P}	December 9, 2024	Chiba Lotte Marines	Los Angeles Dodgers	$1,625,000	January 17, 2025	Minor league contract	
Shinnosuke Ogasawara^{P}	December 10, 2024	Chunichi Dragons	Washington Nationals	$700,000	January 24, 2025	2 years, $3.5 million	
Munetaka Murakami	November 7, 2025	Tokyo Yakult Swallows	Chicago White Sox	$6,750,000	December 21, 2025	2 years, $34 million	
Tatsuya Imai^{P}	November 18, 2025	Saitama Seibu Lions	Houston Astros	$9,750,000	January 2, 2026	3 years, $54 million	
Kazuma Okamoto	November 20, 2025	Yomiuri Giants	Toronto Blue Jays	$10,875,000	January 3, 2026	4 years, $60 million	

^§This was Otsuka's second attempt to play in MLB after an unsuccessful posting the previous year.
^ψThough MLB teams traditionally disclosed bid amounts after negotiating rights were won, the Dodgers chose not to publicly reveal their amount.
^†This specific amount was chosen by Red Sox owner John Henry because he deemed it lucky.
^‡The final three digits, 194, represent Igawa's total strikeout count for his 2006 season.
^€The final four digits represent two significant player numbers—34 was the number that Nolan Ryan, then Rangers principal owner and CEO, wore when he played for the team, and 11 was Darvish's number with the Fighters.
^µThe posting fee is based on a guaranteed contract value of $56 million. The base contract guarantees three years for $43 million plus a player option for a fourth year at $13 million. The Mariners, however, have the right to sign Kikuchi to a four-year, $66 million-extension after the first three years. If the team option is exercised instead of the player option, the Mariners will instead pay a total of $18,050,000 to Seibu.
^PThis player is a pitcher.
^2WThis individual is a two-way player (both a pitcher and position player).

Unsuccessful postings
Player	Posting date	NPB team	Result	Notes
Timo Pérez	February 2, 1999	Hiroshima Toyo Carp	Pérez did not draw any bids from an MLB team and re-signed with the Carp for one season. His contract was purchased by the New York Mets on March 27, 2000.	
Akinori Otsuka^{P}	December 18, 2002	Kintetsu Buffaloes	Otsuka did not draw any bids from an MLB team. He signed with the Chunichi Dragons on March 20, 2003 for ¥95 million ($800,404 in 2003).	
Yusaku Iriki^{P}	November 22, 2005	Hokkaido Nippon-Ham Fighters	Iriki did not draw any bids from an MLB team and was released by the Fighters on December 5, 2005. He was later signed by the New York Mets on January 18, 2006 to a one-year, $750,000 contract.	
Koji Mitsui^{P}	December 18, 2008	Saitama Seibu Lions	Mitsui did not draw any bids from an MLB team. He was re-posted the next month.	
Koji Mitsui^{P}^{§}	January 8, 2009	Saitama Seibu Lions	Mitsui again did not draw any bids from an MLB team. He was re-signed by the Lions on January 20, 2009, to a one-year, ¥57 million ($594,453 in 2009) contract.	
Hisashi Iwakuma^{P}	November 1, 2010	Tohoku Rakuten Golden Eagles	The Oakland A's were awarded exclusive negotiating rights on November 7, 2010, after bidding $19.1 million. Contract negotiations ended without an agreement and Iwakuma returned to the Eagles.	
Hiroki Sanada^{P}	November 23, 2011	Yokohama Baystars	Sanada did not draw any bids from an MLB team. He was later released by the BayStars.	
Hiroyuki Nakajima	November 28, 2011	Saitama Seibu Lions	The New York Yankees were awarded exclusive negotiating rights after bidding $2.5 million. Contract negotiations ended without an agreement and Nakajima returned to the Lions.	
Tony Barnette^{P}	November 2, 2015	Tokyo Yakult Swallows	Barnette did not draw any bids from an MLB team and was released by the Swallows. He was later signed by the Texas Rangers on December 15, 2015 to a two-year, $3.5 million contract.	
Ryosuke Kikuchi	December 3, 2019	Hiroshima Toyo Carp	Kikuchi did not secure a contract with any MLB team and instead signed a 4-year contract extension worth ¥1.2 billion ($10.8 million in 2019) with the Carp on December 27, 2019.	
Haruki Nishikawa	December 3, 2020	Hokkaido Nippon Ham Fighters	Nishikawa did not secure a deal with any of the MLB teams.	
Tomoyuki Sugano^{P}	December 8, 2020	Yomiuri Giants	On January 7, 2021, Sugano's posting period ended and he didn't sign with an MLB team, re-signing with the Giants.	
Kona Takahashi^{P}	November 21, 2025	Saitama Seibu Lions	On January 4, 2026, Takahashi's posting period ended without him securing a deal with any of the MLB teams.	

^§This is the only instance that a player has posted more than once in the same posting period.
^PThis player is a pitcher.

== Criticism ==
Since its implementation in late 1998 the posting system has been heavily criticized. Ichiro Suzuki's agent remarked that "the player literally gets zero advantage from [the posting system]... the Japanese teams benefit by holding the players hostage". Don Nomura called the process a "slave auction". Much of the criticism of the system stems from its forcing NPB players to negotiate their contracts solely with the MLB team that submitted the highest bid. The Japan Times columnist Marty Kuehnert believes that since no other team is allowed to submit competitive counter-offers, negotiations result in salaries below the player's market value. Kuehnert also believes the system fosters a "take-it-or-leave-it" situation; if the team and the player have not finalized contract negotiations by the end of a 30-day period, the team can make a low offer knowing that the player's only other option is to play in Japan for another year. It has been suggested that this is a violation of the Anti-Monopoly Act, a Japanese antitrust law that prohibits parties from signing an international agreement or contract that "contains such matters as constitute an unreasonable restraint of trade or unfair business practices".

The Japan Professional Baseball Players Association (JPBPA) was not consulted before the system was implemented by NPB club owners, and did not subsequently ratify it. Since its introduction JPBPA has expressed many concerns, likening the process to "human trafficking". Agreeing that the system takes unfair advantage of NPB players, the MLBPA offered to help JPBPA fight the posting system in court. However, according to one JPBPA official, the Japanese court process is too long and involved; therefore, the "problem can't be helped".

Yomiuri Giants club representative Hidetoshi Kiyotake has expressed dislike of the system, because it enables Major League Baseball to poach players from Japan. By using the posting system, he says, Japanese teams make a profit in the short term, but by allowing Japan's best players to be sold to MLB, NPB teams and Japanese baseball suffer in the longer term. When Giants pitcher Koji Uehara asked to be posted in 2005, Kiyotake denied his request, saying: "We don't recognize the posting system. I've said from the beginning that this is out of the question."

In the middle of the 2012–13 posting season, MLB approached NPB seeking to change the way MLB teams bid for the right to negotiate with NPB players. Instead of using a silent auction in which teams bid blindly, MLB would prefer its teams to participate in a traditional, open auction where the bids are known and teams can knowingly outbid each other. Such a change would likely lower the price of the transfer fees paid to NPB teams. MLB and the players' unions agree that they'd prefer to see the players receive more money for the transfer rather than the teams. The Japan Times columnist Jason Coskrey also believed that these talks provided the JPBPA an opportunity to voice their concerns about the posting system and attempt to gain more leverage for themselves during the posting process. The new agreement, as noted, was announced on December 16, 2013, with most of the changes desired by MLB and players from both leagues.

=== 2006–07 controversy ===
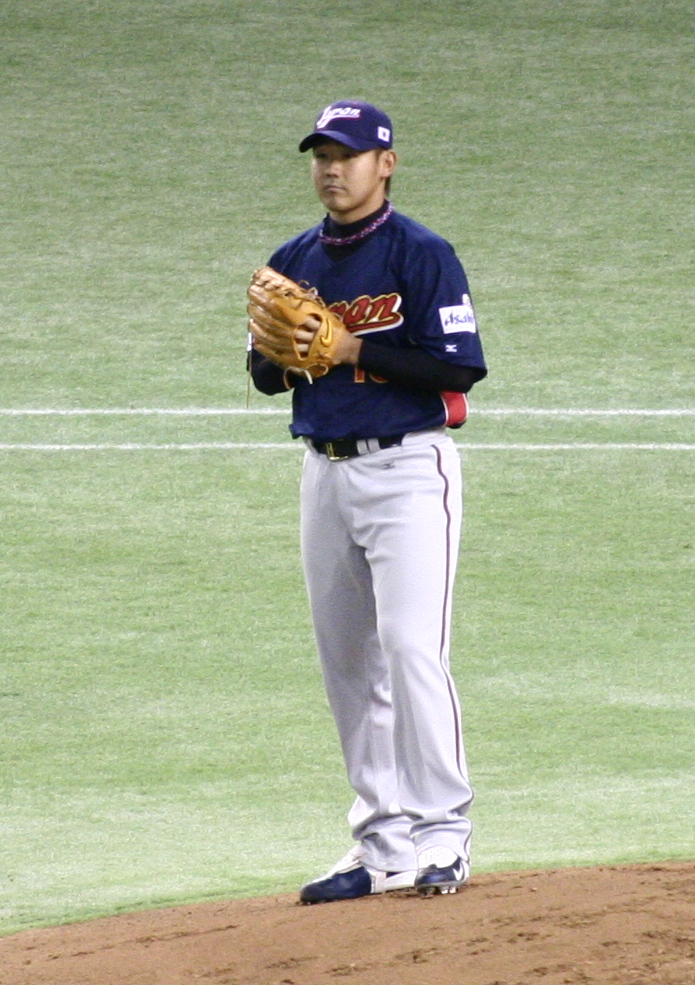
The posting system was criticized after the Boston Red Sox paid a total of $103.1 million to sign pitcher Daisuke Matsuzaka.

The posting system was criticized by MLB insiders and by the U.S. media, after the controversial 2006–07 posting period. Before the posting of the period's first player, Daisuke Matsuzaka, in early November 2006, there was speculation that he might draw bids as high as $30 million—more than twice the previous record bid that Ichiro Suzuki had garnered in 2000–01. After his silent auction was closed, it was revealed that Matsuzaka had drawn a bid of $51.1 million, shocking American and Japanese baseball executives. The Boston Red Sox's winning bid was more than $11 million higher than the next largest.

With the negotiations between Matsuzaka and the Red Sox at a stalemate as the negotiation period neared its close, The Washington Post's Dave Sheinin questioned both parties' intentions. Sheinin believed that the Red Sox had foreseen the contractual stalemate and had submitted a high bid simply to deny the New York Yankees an opportunity to negotiate with Matsuzaka. However, after Matsuzaka's agent Scott Boras threatened to take Matsuzaka back to NPB if his price was not met, Sheinin theorized that Boras intentionally wanted to hinder contract negotiations. ESPN The Magazine's Tim Kurkjian described the situation as "the most obvious game of chicken ever." Sheinin suggested that, should the negotiations fail, Boras could take legal action on the grounds that the requirement of MLB teams to pay large transfer fees to NPB teams artificially depressed the player's personal contract. Boras did not believe that the transfer fee should affect the player's compensation.

Despite the negotiation difficulties, the Boston Red Sox eventually signed Matsuzaka. The team paid approximately $103.1 million in total, including the transfer fee and contract, to acquire the pitcher. Kurkjian believes that with fees and contracts this high, small-market teams could not afford to compete with large-market teams for the rights to negotiate with some posted Japanese players. Kurkjian blames the posting system's use of a blind bidding system as the cause of Matsuzaka's "outrageous offer." He also postulates that Matsuzaka's high bid amount helped to inflate the bids for Kei Igawa who was posted two weeks later, perpetuating the problem further. After winning the negotiation rights to Igawa, Yankees' general manager Brian Cashman told reporters that "the posting system, clearly with what took place this winter, might not necessarily be the best system". Kurkjian claims that other MLB executives already believe that a traditional free agent structure, where the highest bidder wins, would be better than the current system. Cashman and Yankees team president Randy Levine met with NPB team officials in early 2007 to discuss the posting system, among other things. These meetings did not result in any immediate changes.

== See also ==
- Baseball in Japan
- Transfer in association football
