= Hiroki Sanada =

Japanese baseball player

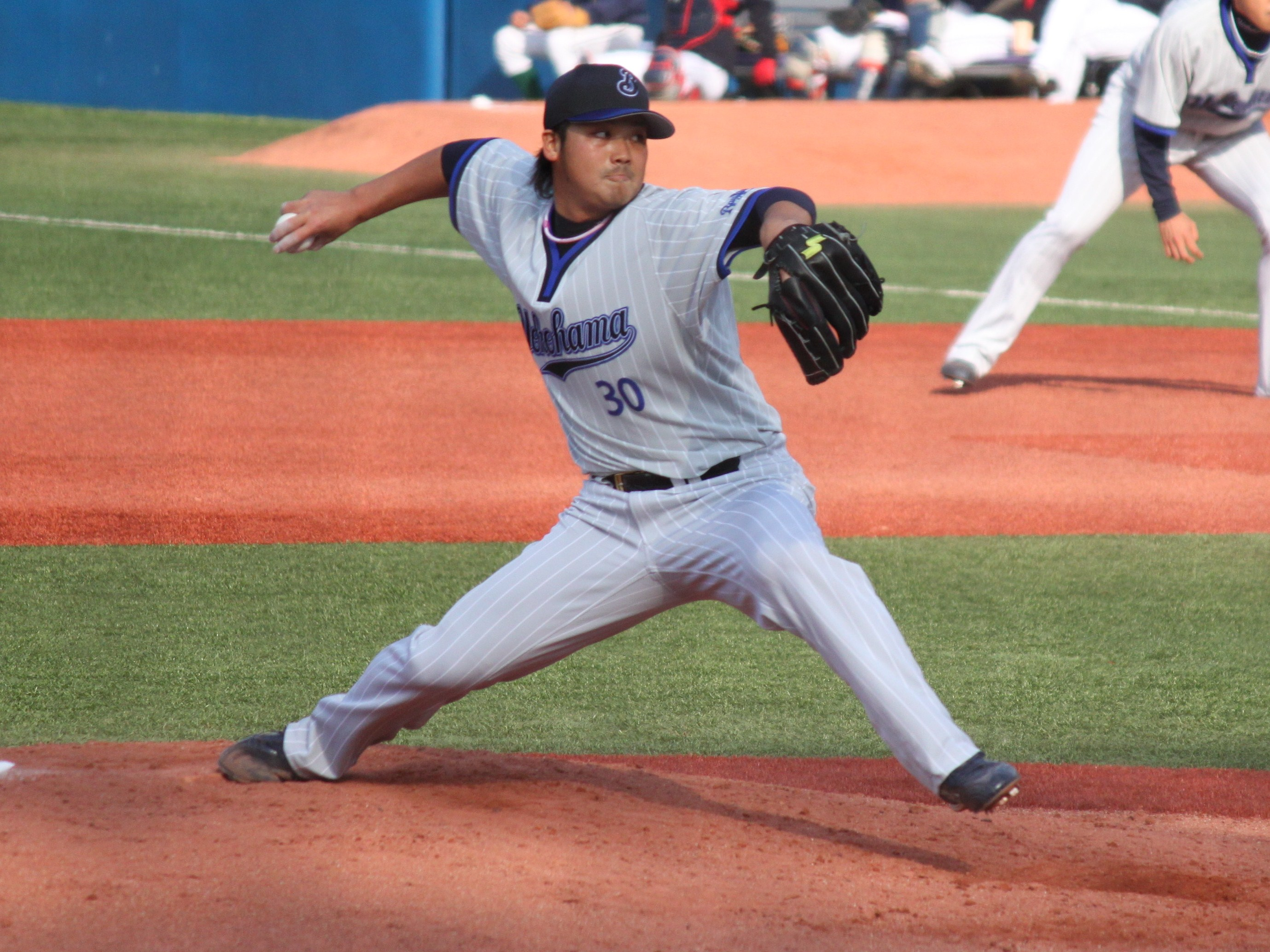
- Pitcher
- Born: February 7, 1984 (age 42); Osaka, Japan
- Batted: Right Threw: Right

Professional debut
- NPB: July 7, 2002, for the Yomiuri Giants
- CPBL: March 24, 2013, for the Brother Elephants

Last appearance
- CPBL: October 10, 2013, for the Brother Elephants
- NPB: July 7, 2014, for the Tokyo Yakult Swallows

NPB statistics
- Win–loss record: 24–28
- Earned run average: 4.42
- Strikeouts: 240

CPBL statistics
- Win–loss record: 3–2
- Earned run average: 2.24
- Strikeouts: 47
- Stats at Baseball Reference

Teams
- Yomiuri Giants (2002–2008); Yokohama BayStars (2008–2011); Yomiuri Giants (2012); Brother Elephants (2013); Tokyo Yakult Swallows (2014)

Hiroki Sanada (真田 裕貴, born February 7, 1984) is a professional baseball player from Takasago, Hyōgo, Japan (though was born in Osaka Prefecture). He began his career as a pitcher for the Yomiuri Giants and currently plays for the Tokyo Yakult Swallows. In November 2011, the Stars announced that they would use the posting system and auction Sanada's negotiating rights to Major League Baseball teams.
