= Zade =

Zade is a surname and a patronymic derived from Persian, meaning "son of", and a given name. Notable people with the name include:

- Ali Nayip Zade, Cretan Muslim
- Muçi Zade, Albanian poet
- Zade Dirani (born 1980), Jordanian and American pianist

== See also ==
- Zada (suffix)
- Zadeh, also Zade
