= Dahal =

Dahal is a surname of Khas people of South Asia, primarily found among Hindu communities such as Bahun and Khatri Chhetri of Nepal, and to a lesser extent in other South Asian countries such as India and Bhutan. The Dahal surname belongs to Vatsa clan and traces its ancestry to sage Jamadagni, one of the saptarishi in Hinduism.

== Notable people ==
- Pushpa Kamal Dahal, Nepali politician and former Prime Minister of Nepal
- Nani Maiya Dahal, Nepali politician
- Shashikala Dahal, Nepali politician
- Narayan Prasad Dahal, Nepali politician
- Bhusan Dahal, Nepali media personality
- Dayaram Dahal, Nepali film director
- Dinesh D.C., Nepali film director
- Bhim Prasad Dahal, Indian politician and novelist
- Renu Dahal, Nepali politician
- Shailendra Kumar Upadhyay Dahal, Nepali politician
- Chandra Devi Dahal, Nepali footballer
- Nara Bahadur Dahal (born 1960), Nepali long-distance runner
- Prince Dahal, Nepali badminton player
- Ramesh Dahal, Nepali songwriter and lyricist
- Rachana Dahal (born 1997), Nepali singer, songwriter, and composer

== See also ==
- Indo-Aryan people
- Indo-Aryan languages
- Gorkha Kingdom
- Khas people
- Khas Kingdom
- Pahadi people of Nepal
