= Jaghatsadzor =

Village in Gegharkunik, Armenia

Jaghatsadzor Ջաղացաձոր
- Location within Armenia Location within Gegharkunik
- Coordinates: 40°08′48″N 45°48′56″E
- Country: Armenia
- Province: Gegharkunik
- Municipality: Vardenis

Population (2011)
  - Total: 100
- Time zone: UTC+4 (AMT)

Jaghatsadzor (Armenian: Ջաղացաձոր) is a village in the Vardenis Municipality of the Gegharkunik Province of Armenia. In 1988-1989 Armenian refugees from Azerbaijan settled in the village.

== See also ==
- Tofig Huseynzade, Azerbaijani journalist and poet born in the village
