= Zaidee =

Zaidee is a feminine given name which derived from the name Sadie, which is also derived from the name Sarah. It means princess in Hebrew.

== List of people with the name ==
- Zaidee C. Bliss, wife of Anson Goodyear
- Zaidee Jackson (1897–1970), American singer
- Zaidee Mary Brasier, mother of Theresa May

=== Fictional characters ===
- Zaidee, in Dying to Live

== See also ==
- Zaidi (surname)
