= Tofig Huseynzade =

Philologist, folklorist, journalist and poet of Azerbaijan

- Born: 20 September 1946; Sariyagub, Armenian SSR
- Died: 13 November 2006 (aged 60); Baku, Azerbaijan
- Occupations: philologist, folklorist, journalist, poet

Tofig Muhammad oglu Huseynzade (Azerbaijani: Tofiq Məhəmməd oğlu Hüseynzadə; 20 September 1946 – 13 November 2006) also spelled as Tofiq Huseynzade was a philologist, folklorist, journalist and poet of Azerbaijan. He was a member of the Union of Journalists of the USSR (1987).

== Biography ==
Huseynzade was born on 20 September 1946 in Sariyagub (present-day Jaghatsadzor), a village of Basargechar district (present-day Gegharkunik Province) of the Armenian SSR.

He was admitted into the Faculty of Philology at Azerbaijan State Pedagogical University (1965–1971). Afterwards, he continued his high level of education at İnstitute of Folklore of ANAS. During the period of the Soviet Union, he had held different positions in Armenia. In 1988, during the mass deportation of Azerbaijanis from Armenia, he moved to Baku with his family and continued his activity here.

He had a close and friendly relationship with Khalil Rza Uluturk, a People's Poet of Azerbaijan SSR.

He was the father of Rafig Huseynzade who is a member of the European Association of Urology, urologist, and Doctor of Medicine; and was the brother of Rafig Huseynzade, a doctor-oncologist and poet.

Tofig Huseynzade died on 13 November 2006.

== Career ==
From 1970, Huseynzade started to work as a teacher at a school in Barkhudarly, Qazakh District, then continued to pedagogical activity in Sariyagub, Basargechar. From November 1979 he worked as a literary worker in Basargechar district newspaper ("Vardenis"), and since November 1986 head of the agricultural department. Since 1987, he had been admitted to the membership of the Union of Journalists of the USSR. Later he worked at ANAS on philology.

== Scientific activity ==
He has been well-known in the Azerbaijani press, TV, and radio, with various articles and poems published about the folklore of Goycha and other historical subjects, acting as a journalist in "New Azerbaijan", "Nation", "Right Way" and other newspapers.

He made researches about Miskin Abdal, a thinker in the Safavid period, and at the same time his great grandfather and in 2005 he published a book called "Safavids' Great Auliya – Miskin Abdal". In 2003, he was a PhD student at the Folklore Institute of the National Academy of Sciences. He completed his dissertation on "Poetics of Ashiq's words" in 2005, and his death did not allow him to defend his work.

In his three-dimensional book, named as "Dream Lane", Tofiq Huseynzade's poetic world, stories and scientific researching work ("Miskin Abdal – Geyb Arani, Tasawwuf Piri") which are the first scientifically substantiated findings in Azerbaijani literary regarding with the interpretation of "Miskin" and "Abdal", that describe the high divine-spiritual consciousness and rankings of the great and rich creativity, have been added.

== Works ==
1. Hüseynzadə Tofiq Məhəmməd oğlu. "Səfəvilərin böyük övliyası – Miskin Abdal", Bakı, "Şəms", 2005. 386 səh. 1000 nüsxə. (archive)
2. Hüseynzadə Tofiq Məhəmməd oğlu. Aşıq deyişmələrinin poetikası: monoqrafiya / T.M.Hüseynzadə; elmi red. M.Q.Allahmanlı. — Bakı: "Gənclik", 2017. — 312 s. (archive and archive)
3. Hüseynzadə Tofiq Məhəmməd oğlu. Xəyal cığırı (I cild – şeirlər), Bakı: "Zərdabi", 2018. — 600 s. (archive)
4. Hüseynzadə Tofiq Məhəmməd oğlu. Xəyal cığırı (II cild – şeirlər), Bakı: "Zərdabi", 2018. — 600 s.
5. Hüseynzadə Tofiq Məhəmməd oğlu. Xəyal cığırı (III cild – şeirlər və "Miskin Abdal – Qeyb Ərəni, Təsəvvüf Piri" əsəri), Bakı: "Zərdabi", 2018. — 600 s.
6. Hüseynzadə Tofiq Məhəmməd oğlu. "Miskin Abdal – Qeyb Ərəni, Təsəvvüf Piri", Bakı: "Zərdabi LTD", 2018. — 360 s. ISBN 978-9952-476-86-6

== Bibliography ==
- The Guiding Purpose Strategy. Clink Street Publishing. October 2020. ISBN 978-1-912262-38-0.
