= Quruzma =

- Municipality
- Location within Azerbaijan
- Coordinates: 40°05′24″N 48°37′22″E
- Country: Azerbaijan
- Rayon: Sabirabad

Population
  - Total: 1,917
- Time zone: UTC+4 (AZT)
  - Summer (DST): UTC+5 (AZT)

Quruzma (also, Quruzmaq, Kuruzma, and Quruzma) is a village and municipality in the Sabirabad Rayon of Azerbaijan. It has a population of 1,917.
