= Rafael Amen-Zadeh =

Azerbaijani physicist

- Born: Rafael Amen-Zadeh; December 31, 1943 (age 82); Azerbaijan SSR
- Scientific career
- Fields: Mathematics
- Workplaces: BSU

Rafael Amen-Zadeh (born 1943) is a professor in the physical and mathematical sciences and the "Honored Teacher" of Azerbaijan (2009).

== Life ==
Rafael Amen-Zadeh, the son of Joseph, was born in Baku on December 31, 1943. In 1950-1960 he studied at the secondary school number of 49 in Baku. In 1960-1966, he studied at the Mechanics and Mathematics Faculty of Mechanical of BSU. To the development of education and science of the Presidential Decree of 30 October 2009, the "Honored Teacher" was named. He is married and has three children.

== Education, Academic degrees and scientific titles ==
- 1960-1966, student of Mechanics and Mathematics Faculty of Baku State University.
- 1966-1969, MVLomonosov Moscow State University, "the theory of plasticity" department Acad. Under the head of YN Rabotnov, he was a graduate student.
- 1970, "Solving the problems of sass of the thin stickness construction elements by the method of variation."
- 1980,"Spread of waves on the cover filled with liquid"

== Labor activity ==
- 1982 - h / h, head of the Department, The department of theoretical mechanics and continuum mechanics, Mechanics and Mathematics Faculty, BSU.
- 1972-1982, senior lecturer, Theory of functions and functional analysis department, Mechanics and Mathematics Faculty, BSU
- 1969-1972, assistant, Department of Theoretical Mechanics, Mechanics and Mathematics Faculty, BSU.
- His lessons: Continuum mechanics, mechanics of multiphase systems.
- He is the author of two books and 150 scientific articles.

== Research area ==
- Deformable solids mechanics, hydromechanics.

== Participation on international seminars, symposiums and conferences ==
- 1999 in Nizhny Novgorod, Russia: "The theory of shells and plates" XIX International conference.
- 2002 in Nizhny Novgorod, Russia: "The theory of shells and plates" XX International conference.
- 2006 Riga, Latvia: "Mechanics of composite materials" XIV International Conference.
- 2008, Riga, Latvia: "Mechanics of composite materials" XV International conference.
- 2008, Kazan, Russia: "The modern problems of nonlinear mechanics of coatings" International scientific seminar.
- 2008, Moscow, Russia: "The strength of non-structural materials," IV Eurasian scientific and practical conference.
- 1995 Riga, Latvia: "Mechanics of composite materials" IX international conference.

== His books ==
- Mechanics Laboratory Practice (manual) .- 1973
- The whole atmosphere of the basic concepts of mechanics and equations-1987
