= Ciudad Quesada, Alicante =

Ciudad Quesada
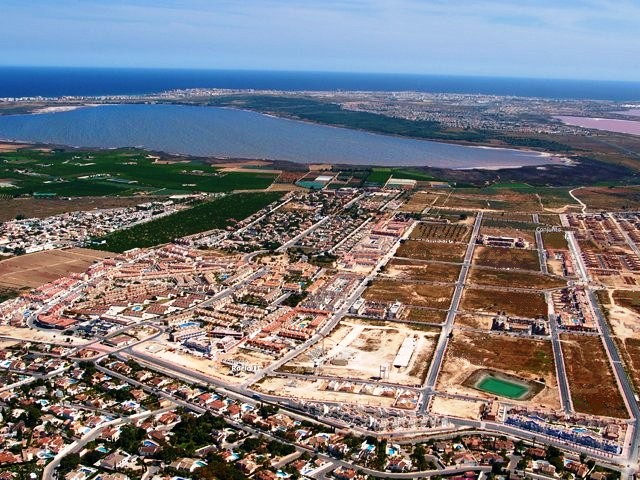
- Ciudad Quesada from above

- Location in Spain
- Coordinates: 38.0655°N 0.7289°W
- Country: Spain
- Autonomous community: Valencian Community
- Province: Alicante
- Elevation: 100 m (330 ft)

Population (2024)
  - Total: 11 622
- Time zone: UTC+1 (CET)
  - Summer (DST): UTC+2 (CEST)

Ciudad Quesada is an urbanisation in the municipality of Rojales in the Province of Alicante, Spain. It has a population of 11, 622 people (INE 2024).

It is located in the southern area of Rojales, 6km from the Mediterranean sea. Justo Quesada, a Spanish entrepreneur, started the city in the 1970s and it is now considered to be a Spanish town with its own sub town hall.

The Quesada companies declared bankruptcy in 2015 with debts of over 100 million Euros.

Ciudad Quesada also has a Norwegian school called Den Norske Skolen I Rojales (DNSR).
