= Rachana Dahal =

Nepalese singer

- रचना दाहाल
- Born: June 8, 1999 (age 26)
- Occupation: Singer
- Years active: 2019–present
- Musical career
- Genres: Indie rock; alternative
- Instruments: Vocals; guitar

Rachana Dahal (Nepali: रचना दाहाल), is a Nepalese singer, songwriter, and composer known for her rebellious songs. Her work as a songwriter and composer is known for exploring intense emotional topics.

== Career ==
Dahal released her first song, Bhumari, in 2019, which she sang, wrote, and composed. As has been the case with nearly all of her songs, it had a slow start but eventually gained popularity. She then released her next song, Soch, in the same year.

In 2020, Dahal released Sapanako Raja and Dagbatti; the latter one conveys the grief of losing a loved one. Since then she has released other hits like Hey Bhagawan and Aagya, which made her more renowned in the Nepali music scene.

== Selected discography ==
The list below does not represent all of her songs; instead, it represents most of her well-known songs. All of which were sung, written, and composed by Dahal herself.

Year	Song	Ref(s)
2019	Bhumari	
2019	Soch	
2020	Sapanako Raja	
2020	Daagbatti	
2020	Hey Bhagawan	
2022	Aagya	
2024	Asambhav	
2024	Alagaav	
2024	Ma Sakdina	
2025	Timi Bhaye	

== Awards ==
Year	Award	Category	Song	Result	Ref.
2025	National Music Award	Best Pop singer	Asambhav	Nominated	
