= Raheem Ghamzada =

Pashto-language poet

- رحيم غمزده
- Born: 1939; Khogyani District, Nangarhar Province, Afghanistan
- Died: 16 December 2011 (aged 71–72)
- Known for: Pashto and Dari Poetry, Songs
- Notable work: Zama Khkulay Janana, Dilbar e Man, Stargo de Janan, etc.

Raheem Ghamzada (Pashto: رحيم غمزده), was a prominent Pashto-language poet and singer in the 1970s until his death in 2011 due to cancer. Ghamzada was the first singer to use both eastern and western tunes when composing Pashto folk music.

== Early life ==
Ghamzada was born in Khogyani District in the south of Nangarhar Province, Afghanistan. He began working with music at age 14.

== Career ==
Ghamzada worked for 60 years in the music branch of Radio Television Afghanistan (RTA). He recorded nearly two hundred songs for Afghan National Radio and Television.

He combined Indian and Western compositions with Pashto songs. Ghamzada composed all his songs.

Rahim Ghamzada was also a poet and recited many of his poems with music. He also sang the poems of Ghani Khan and Rehman Baba, among other popular poets. Ghamzada also won many awards and accolades for his art.

His collection of poems, titled Pashto (زما ښکلی جانانه), was compiled and published by Lal Pacha Azmoon, a professor at Kabul University.

== Personal life ==
Ghamzada belonged to the Khogyani tribe of the ethnic Pashtuns. His work is considered a fusion between classic and modern poetry. He wrote classical poetry, blended it with recent innovations, and introduced new ideas in Pashto.

Ghamzada had three sons at the time of his death. He lived near the Angorbagh area of Jalalabad's second district.

Ghamzada had been fighting cancer for three years at the time of his death. He was buried in Khogyani District.
