= Federico Ortiz Quezada =

Mexican urologist (born 1935)

Federico Ortiz Quezada (born 1935 in Mexico City) is a Mexican urologist.

He received his M.D. from the National University of México in 1959. He finished his training in urology at the General Hospital of Mexico City and Cornell University in New York, from 1959 to 1963. He served as head of the urology department at the National Medical Center in México and adviser to the Instituto Mexicano of Social Security from 1963 to 1973.

He is professor of the Specialist Hospital of the XXI Medical Center. The operating room of this hospital bears his name. Ortiz Quezada is a pioneer in the practice of organ transplant surgery, and he is considered the founder of modern urology in México. He used to be the president of the Instituto Nacional de Bioética (National Institute of Bioethics).

He was adviser to Health Policy and Planning Journal. Oxford University Press (1988 to 1992), Mexican Editor to Sexual Current Contents, Science Press of London (2002 to 2004) and Director of Sexualidad, Ciencia, Amor (2003 to 2006).

Quezada has published extensively in scientific journals and has written 34 books. Dr Federico Ortiz Quezada is member of the Mexican Writers Association and Pen Club International. He has been a Professor of the Medical Faculty and of Philosophy and Letters at the National Autonomous Mexican University.

== Works ==
1. Fascicles of Urology (1970)
2. Adenocarcinoma of the Kidney (1973)
3. Health in Poverty (1982)
4. Vida and Muerte of the Mexicano (1982)
5. Illness and Man (1985)
6. Medicine and Man (1986)
7. An Act of Dying (1987)
8. Diagnóstico (1987)
9. The Soothsayer of the Truth (1988)
10. Letters to a Young Doctor (1990)
11. Medicine is Sick (1991)
12. Yuhcatiliztli: National Identity (1992)
13. Human Rights and Medical Science (1993)
14. Manos of Dioses (1995)
15. Memory of Death (1996)
16. Amoricida (1996)
17. The Work of the Physician (1997)
18. CLetters to a Female Doctor (1998)
19. Hospitals (1998)
20. Health Care for the Age of Learning (2000)
21. Freud and Dreams (2000)
22. Descartes and Medicine (2001)
23. Medical Models (2001)
24. A Doctor’s Diary (2001)
25. Anatomy of Love (2001)
26. His Majesty, the Prostate (2002)
27. Cordelia's Journeys (2002)
28. Sexual Impotence (2002)
29. Life Alternative. History of Transplantation (2003)
30. Principia Medica (First Prize in the category of text from The Editorial Mexican Industry )
31. Dying, Death, Immortality (2005)
32. Love and De-Lovely (2007).
