= Zadeh =

Zadeh (also Zade) (Persian: زاده) is a Persian patronymic suffix meaning 'descendant of' or 'born of' used in names mainly in Iran and Azerbaijan.

Notable people whose names contain 'Zadeh' include:

- Lotfi A. Zadeh (1921–2017), mathematician, electrical engineer, and computer scientist
- Mirza Fatali Akhundzadeh (1812–1878), Azerbaijani author, playwright, and philosopher
- Franghiz Ali-Zadeh (born 1947), Soviet and Azerbaijani composer and pianist
- Rafael Amen-Zadeh (born 1943), Soviet and Azerbaijani mathematician and physicist
- Nailya Asker-zade (born 1987), Russian journalist and television presenter of Azerbaijani descent
- Hashem Beikzadeh (born 1984), Iranian footballer
- Sadegh Ghotbzadeh (1936–1982), Iranian politician
- Sabir Gusein-Zade (born 1950), Russian mathematician
- Masoud Hashemzadeh (born 1981), Iranian wrestler
- T. J. Houshmandzadeh (born 1977), American NFL football player
- Kamyar Kalantar-Zadeh (born 1963), American physician and medical researcher
- Jalil Mammadguluzadeh (1866–1932), Azerbaijani satirist and writer
- Aziza Mustafazadeh (born 1969), Soviet and Azerbaijani singer, pianist, and composer
- Vagif Mustafazadeh (1940–1979), Azerbaijani jazz pianist and composer
- Hossein Rezazadeh (born 1978), Iranian politician, retired Olympic weightlifter, and world record holder
- Kazem Sadegh-Zadeh (1942–2023), Iranian and German philosopher of medicine
- Ilya Salmanzadeh (born 1986), Swedish music producer
- Avetis Sultan-Zade (1889–1938), Persian-born ethnic Armenian communist
- Aysel Teymurzadeh (born 1989), Azerbaijani singer
- Amirhossein Yahyazadeh (born 1998), Iranian professional footballer

== See also ==
- Zadeh, a common element (i.e., that sequence, though not necessarily with the initial letter in upper-case) in Iranian names and toponyms -- Hence, see, although due to technical considerations it will omit most of the many instances where that letter is immediately preceded, not by either a hyphen or white-space, but by a letter of the alphabet.
- Zada (suffix)
- Zade
