= Quesada (surname) =

- Language: Spanish

Origin
- Meaning: fertile land, or narrow passage, or old castle
- Region of origin: Quesada, Jaén, Andalucia, Spain

Quesada is a Spanish toponymic surname originating from the town of Quesada in Jaén, Andalucia. It was originally the surname of the nobility of the town of Quesada. It is also briefly mentioned in the tale of Don Quixote as a possible alternate surname for the title character. The name was also used by the Moors at the time.

== History ==
This surname was first recorded during the 1240s AD, in a manuscript about Ferdinand III of Castile's army recapturing Seville.

== People ==
- Alfredo Quesada (born 1949), Peruvian football player
- Alfredo De Quesada, Puerto Rican actor
- Carlos Manuel de Céspedes y Quesada (1871–1939), Cuban writer, politician, diplomat, and sixth President of Cuba
- Manuel de Quesada y Loynaz, Cuban army general
- Carlos Alvarado (born 1980), President of Costa Rica (2018–2022)
- Carlos Quesada (born 1985), Costa Rican basketball player
- Diego Camacho Quesada (born 1976), Spanish footballer
- Elwood Richard Quesada (1904–1993), American administrator and air force general, later owned 1961 Washington Senators
- Francisco Miró Quesada Cantuarias (1918–2019), Peruvian philosopher
- Francisco Morazán Quesada (1792–1842), President of Central America
- Gaspar de Quesada (died April 7, 1520), participant in Magellan's voyage
- Gonzalo Quesada (born 1974), Argentine rugby player
- Gonzalo Jiménez de Quesada (1506–1579), Spanish explorer and conquistador
- Jenaro Quesada, 1st Marquis of Miravalles (1818–1889), Spanish soldier
- Joe Quesada (born 1962), editor-in-chief of Marvel Comics
- José Martín Quesada (1935–1996), Spanish cyclist
- Juan Rafael Elvira Quesada (born 1956), Mexican politician
- Nya Quesada (1919−2013), Argentine actress
- Odette Quesada (born 1965), Filipina singer
- Omar Quesada (born 1965), a Peruvian lawyer and politician
- Salvador Quesada (1886–1971), Olympic fencer
- Vicente Fox Quesada (born 1942), former President of Mexico
- Vicente Quesada (1812–1877), Chilean lawyer and lawmaker, father of Jenaro Quesada
- Yoelbi Quesada (born 1973), Cuban athlete in the triple jump

=== Quezada variant ===
- Steven Michael Quezada (born 1963), American comedian
- Quinley Quezada (born 1997), American footballer
