= Ali bey Huseynzade =

Azerbaijani writer and philosopher (1864–1940)

- Əli bəy Hüseynzadə
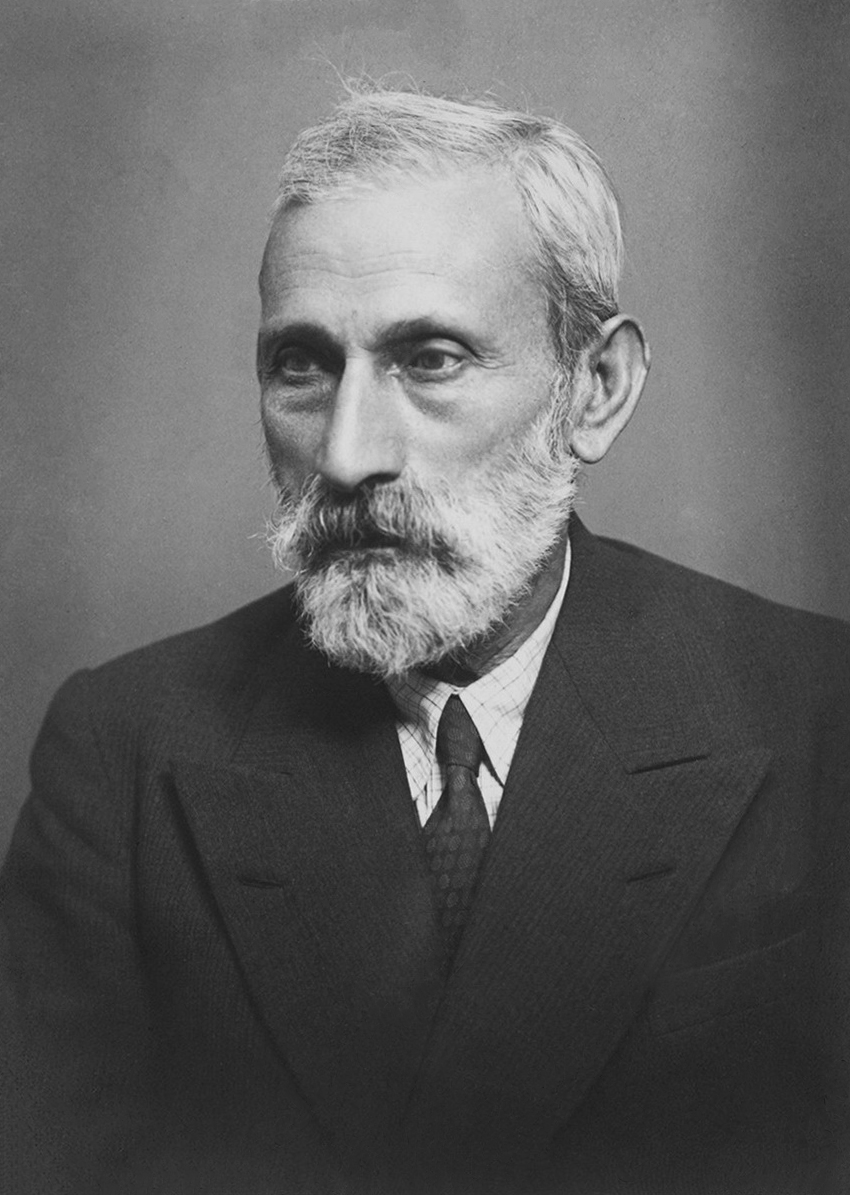
- Huseynzade in 1933

Presiding member of the Committee of Union and Progress
- In office 1910–?

Personal details
- Born: March 7, 1864 Salyan, Shemakha uezd, Baku Governorate, Russian Empire
- Died: March 17, 1940 (aged 76) Istanbul, Turkey
- Occupation: Writer, philosopher, publicist, artist and doctor

Ali bey Huseyn oghlu Huseynzade (Azerbaijani: Əli bəy Hüseyn oğlu Hüseynzadə; Turkish: Hüseyinzade Ali Turan; Salyan, March 7, 1864 – Istanbul, March 17, 1940) was an Azerbaijani writer who played an important role in the development of an Azerbaijani nationalist movement at the start of the 20th century. His concept of Turkify, Islamize, Europeanize was reflected in the modern Flag of Azerbaijan.

== Early years ==
Ali bey Huseynzade was born in 1864 to a family of Muslim religious clerics in Salyan, in the present-day Azerbaijan. His grandfather Mahammadali Huseinzadeh was the Sheikh ul-Islam (Supreme religious leader) of the Caucasus for 32 years. His father, Molla Huseyin Huseynzade, was well-educated. After his mother Hatice's death, Ali Bey and his brother, Ismail Bey, moved with their father to Tbilisi. In Tbilisi, Molla Huseyin worked as a mathematics teacher at Muslim schools, and Ali bey Huseynzade continued his education there. Following his father's death, he came under the care of his grandfather, who supported his education. Mahammadali Huseinzadeh, dramatist Mirza Fatali Akhundov, Akinchi newspaper publisher Hasan bey Zardabi, and poet Seyid Azim Shirvani with whom he had close relationships, had an influence on Ali Bey's intellectual development. Following the advice and support of Mirza Fatali Akhundov, he sent Ali Bey to continue his education at the Tbilisi Gymnasium in 1875. Ali Bey studied there for ten years (1875-1885), learning Russian, Latin, Greek, French, and German at an advanced level.

In 1885, he entered the Physics and Math Department at Saint Petersburg University. Upon graduation from there in 1889, Huseynzade moved to Istanbul, where he entered the Medical faculty of Istanbul University (IU). His poem Turan, composed during his time as a student, became the first poetic expression advocating for a unity of Turks based on ethnic identity. After graduation from IU, he served as a military doctor in the Ottoman Army, and subsequently as an assistant professor at IU. Huseynzade was one of the founders of the Committee of Union and Progress. Ziya Gökalp, was influenced by his Pan-Turkist ideology, and referred to Huseynzade as one of his most important teachers.

== Public activity ==
Huseynzade’s time in Istanbul spanned several decades, with his first stay in the Ottoman capital lasting from 1889 to 1903. During this period, he maintained his Russian subjecthood but acquired Ottoman subjecthood shortly after his arrival. Over the course of his fourteen years in Istanbul, he formed friendships with key figures of the Committee of Union and Progress (CUP) such as Abdullah Cevdet, Ibrahim Temo. These connections made in the 1890s would later benefit him in his political and intellectual endeavors. In 1903, Huseynzade returned to Russia, reportedly due to police harassment stemming from his CUP affiliations.

In 1903, Ali bey returned home and spent the next seven years in Baku. During this period of time, he engaged in scholarly and publishing activities, edited the Hayat newspaper, and served as a chief editor of the Kaspiy newspaper. Huseynzade coedited Hayat with Ahmet Aghaoglu until 1906, when Aghaoglu left to work for İrşad. In 1905, he joined Alimardan bey Topchubashov, Reşit Ibragimov, Farrukh bey Vezirov and Ahmet Aghaoglu as a part of the Azerbaijani delegation to an all-Russian convention of Muslims, where an agreement was reached on establishing of the Ittifaq al Muslimin a single Muslim party in Russian Empire. In 1906, Huseynzade started publishing the magazine Füyuzat (Fusion), financed by the famous philanthropist Haji Zeynalabdin Taghiyev, and harshly criticized the Tsarist government in his writings.

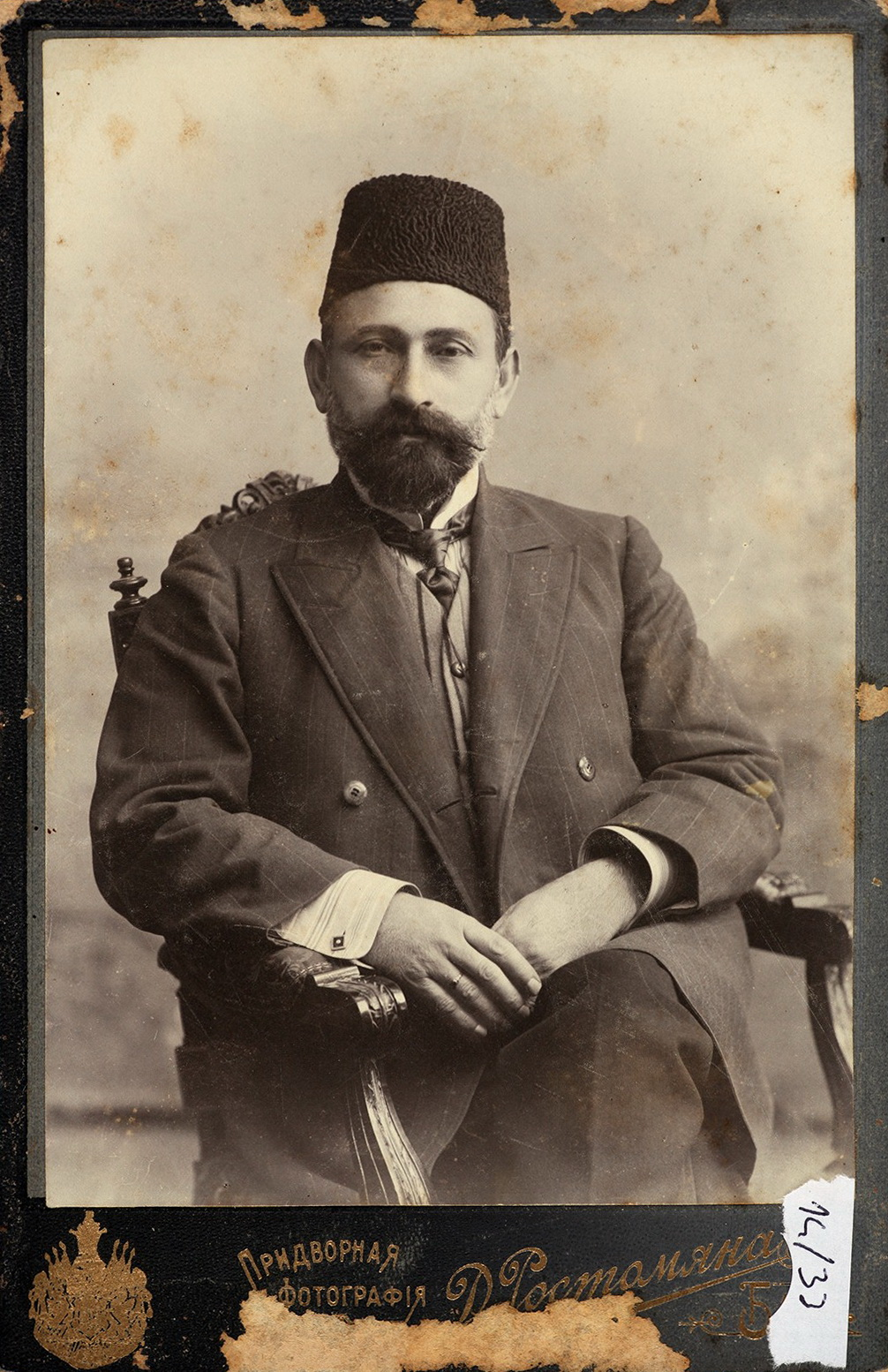
Ali bey Huseynzade in the early 1900s

Füyuzat was a journal influenced by the Ottoman Servet-i Funun and served as a platform for advocating modernization in Azerbaijani culture. In its pages, the slogan Turkify, Islamize, Europeanize (Türkləşmək, İslamlaşmak, Avropalaşmaq) was openly promoted, a phrase later popularized by Ziya Gokalp, which became central to the development of Turkism in the Ottoman Empire. Huseynzade urged Muslim Turks to "embrace the Turkish lifestyle, practice their faith in accordance with Islam, and adopt the modern European way of life" with this slogan. Ali Bey Huseynzade was also the director of the Saadet school.

After the March 31 incident of 1909, when Abdul Hamid II was exiled to Salonica, Huseynzade was invited to Istanbul by his friends in the CUP. Prior to his departure from Russia in December 1910, Huseynzade visited his hometown of Salyan for a week to say farewell to his family and neighbors. Huseynzade arrived in the Ottoman capital in 1910, where he began working as an instructor at the Ottoman Medical College. In addition to his work as a doctor and teacher, he also became involved in various intellectual and literary projects organized by figures like Akchura and Aghaoglu. During the Unionist era, Huseynzade contributed articles to Türk Yurdu and other Ottoman newspapers and journals. He also participated, alongside Akchura and Aghaoglu, in activities on behalf of the Ottoman government during wartime. And in 1911 he was elected a presiding member of the Committee of Union and Progress. From 1915 to 1916 he travelled to several European capitals to reach out for support for the Pan-Turkish movement.

In 1916, Huseynzade and Aghaoglu, who were active in the Committee for the Defense of the Rights of the Muslim Turco-Tatars in Russia, signed memoranda and appeals calling on the Central Powers to defend the rights of Russian Muslims during the peace treaty negotiations. The Turkish thinker Hilmi Ziya Ulken, who personally knew Huseynzade, wrote the following while describing Ali Bey Huseynzade’s activities during this period:

Between 1910 and 1918, he was one of the most devoted members of the Committee of Union and Progress. At the Türk Ocağı, he regularly gathered young people through conversations and exhortations, taking the lead in nationalist movements alongside Gokalp. However, he was neither as productive as Gokalp in adapting his ideas to the course of events nor as sharp-witted as Akchura. Due to his reserved nature and unpretentiousness, his influence was not on the masses but on thinkers.

In 1913, he was a member of the Caucasian Turks Education Society in Istanbul, in 1916, he served on the High Health Council, and he was also a member of the General Center of the Turkish Hungarian Friendship Society. Alongside Akil Muhtar and Nesim Muslih, he was sent to the International Socialist Congress in Stockholm, held in 1917. In 1918, he returned to Azerbaijan to participate in the formation of Azerbaijan Democratic Republic (ADR) and participated in negotiations for the Ottoman support of the ADR against the Baku Commune. Towards the end of 1918, Aghaoglu set out for Paris with the hope of representing Azerbaijan at the Paris Peace Conference. However, while passing through Istanbul, he was arrested by the British. Following his arrest, Huseynzade, who was captured in Istanbul in 1919, was also exiled to Malta. After the fall of ADR in April 1920, Huseynzade permanently settled in Turkey and became a citizen, receiving the surname, Turan.

Huseynzade participated in the First All-Union Turkological Congress held in Baku in 1926, leaving behind notes related to this congress. On the day the congress began, Ali Bey was elected not only to the executive committee but also to the honorary executive committee, alongside Vilhelm Ludwig Thomsen, Nikolai Yakovlevich Marr, and Anatoly Vasilyevich Lunacharsky.

Ali bey Huseynzade's public career came to an end after he was suspected of being involved in a conspiracy to assassinate Mustafa Kemal in 1926. Although he was found innocent, his political career was effectively over. In 1933, he retired from his position at Istanbul University. Huseynzade continued to write his memoirs about the early Republican heroes. In 1940, while having a conversation with a doctor friend about Britain's policy in India, he suffered a heart attack and died at the age of 76.

== Legacy ==
One of the streets in the Yasamal district of Baku is named after Ali bey Huseynzade and there's a statue of him in the center of his hometown.
