= Alejandro Díaz (baseball) =

Dominican Republic baseball player

Alejandro Diaz
- Outfielder
- Born: July 9, 1975 (age 51); San Pedro de Macoris, Dominican Republic
- Bats: Right Throws: Right
- Stats at Baseball Reference

Alejandro Diaz Quezada (previously known as Alejandro Quezada; born July 9, 1975) is a Dominican former professional baseball player. He is the first person to transfer from Nippon Professional Baseball to Major League Baseball through the posting system.

Diaz played for the Hiroshima Toyo Carp in 1998. Prior to the 1999 season, Diaz was posted by Hiroshima to the Cincinnati Reds. He signed a minor league contract with Cincinnati. Diaz played in the Reds' minor league system through 2003, without reaching the major leagues.
