= Alfredo De Quesada =

Puerto Rican actor

Alfredo de Quesada
- Born: San Juan, Puerto Rico
- Occupation: Actor

Alfredo de Quesada is a Puerto Rican film, television and theatre actor.

Born in San Juan, Puerto Rico to Cuban immigrants who resettled in Puerto Rico, De Quesada was raised in San Juan where he attended Colegio San Ignacio de Loyola and went on to graduate with double major in General Management and Theatre Arts from the Carroll School of Management of Boston College (Chestnut Hill, MA). During college he was part of the second oldest collegiate improv comedy troupe in the United States, My Mother's Fleabag, and upon graduation moved to New York City. There he worked regularly with the premiere Hispanic theater company Repertorio Español, and was cast in the internationally acclaimed Argentinean aerial experimental theatre troupe De La Guarda.

Most of his national recognition came when competing in the Telemundo produced reality show Protagonistas de Novela 2, which showcased him as a superior actor in contrast to the rest of the contestants.

He has had guest starring roles in many TV series including Strangers with Candy, Upright Citizens Brigade, One Life to Live, The Blacklist: Redemption, Law & Order, The Knick, and Orange Is the New Black.

He played the part of Israel Pardo in the film Che by Steven Soderbergh.
