= Salyan, Azerbaijan =

Salyan
- City
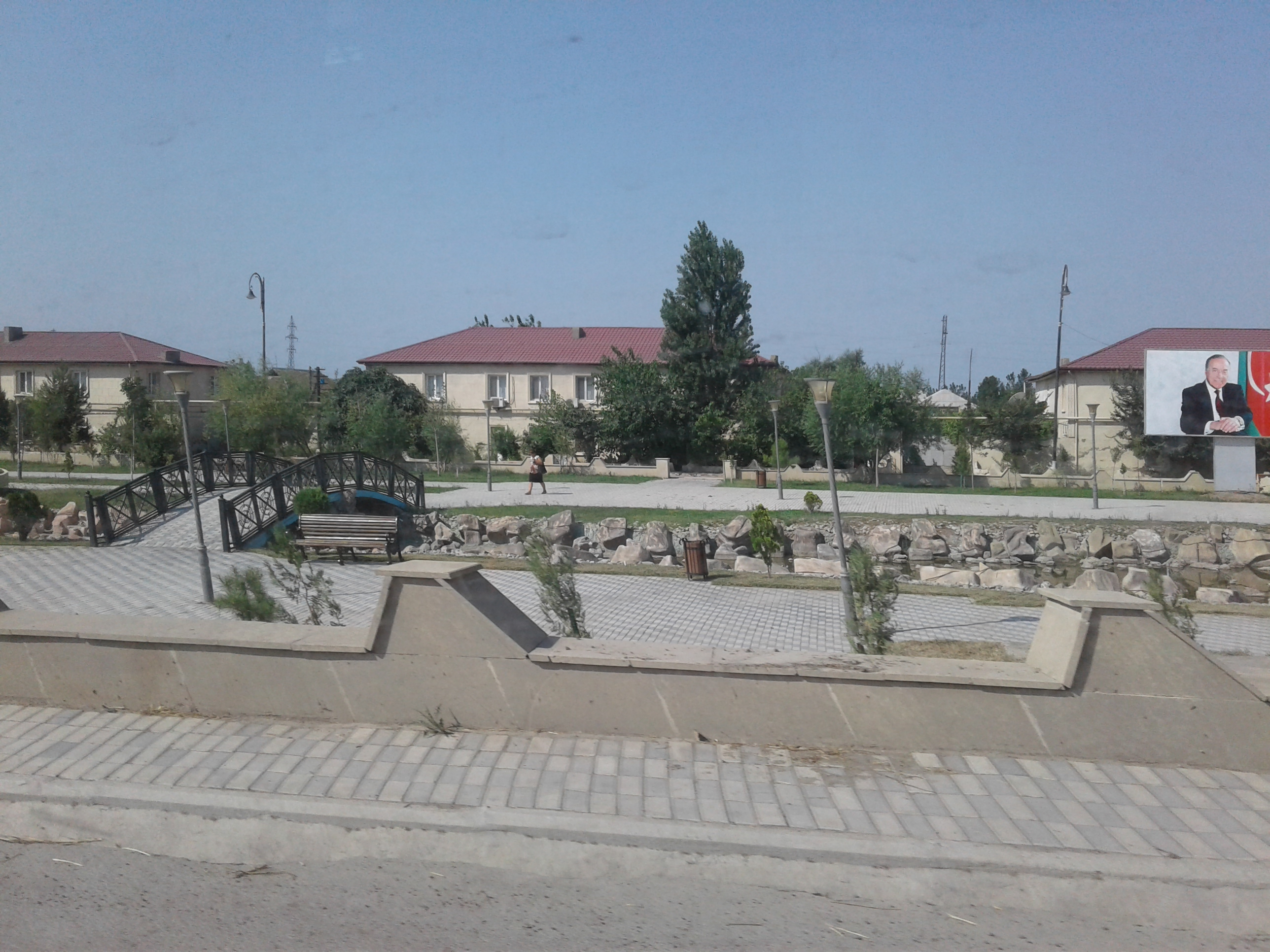

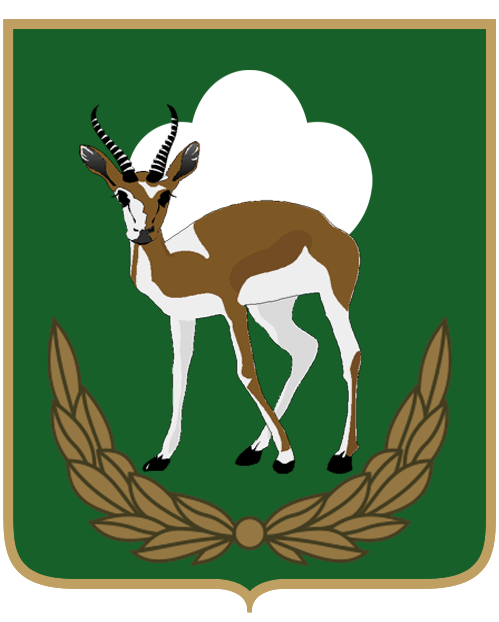
- Seal

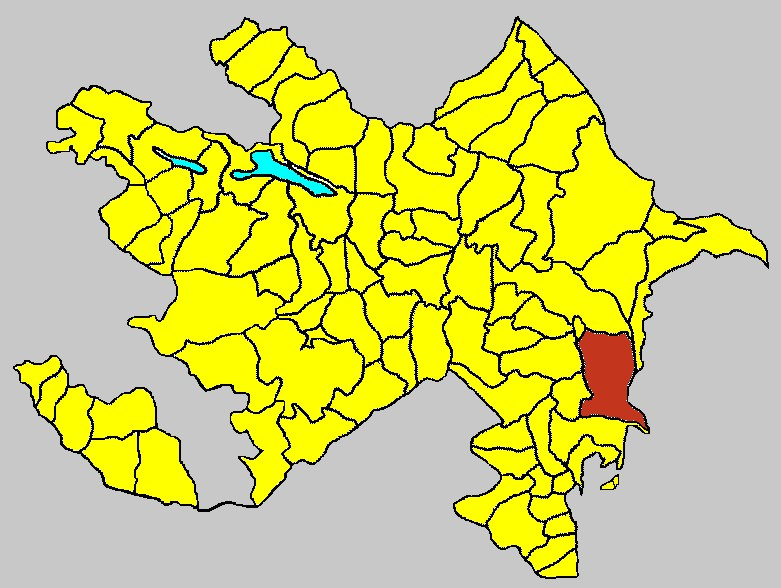

- Location within Azerbaijan
- Coordinates: 39°35′42″N 48°58′45″E
- Country: Azerbaijan
- District: Salyan

Population (2008)
  - Total: 36,100
- Time zone: UTC+4 (AZT)

Salyan (Azerbaijani: Salyan), is a city and the capital of the Salyan District of Azerbaijan. The city of Salyan is industrialized and known for processing caviar.

== History ==
The city of Salyan was called "Dalan-Navur" in Mongolian during the Mongol invasion of Azerbaijan.

The word "Salyan" is either derived from the Arabo-Persian words seyl (flood) and seylan (overflow) or the Turkic word sal (raft). It was part of Quba Khanate during 1680 to 1782 and ruled by various khans. Salyan was the administrative center of the Javad Uyezd of the Baku Governorate.

Throughout its history, Salyan has suffered from floods because of its proximity to the river and the relatively low elevation of most of the town.

== Geography ==
=== Climate ===
Climate data for Salyan (1971–1990)
Month	Jan	Feb	Mar	Apr	May	Jun	Jul	Aug	Sep	Oct	Nov	Dec	Year
Mean daily maximum °C (°F)	7.2 (45.0)	8.3 (46.9)	11.7 (53.1)	19.0 (66.2)	25.0 (77.0)	30.0 (86.0)	33.1 (91.6)	31.9 (89.4)	28.2 (82.8)	21.0 (69.8)	—	9.4 (48.9)	20.5 (68.9)
Daily mean °C (°F)	2.7 (36.9)	3.8 (38.8)	6.6 (43.9)	12.0 (53.6)	18.1 (64.6)	21.2 (70.2)	22.7 (72.9)	22.0 (71.6)	20.7 (69.3)	11.6 (52.9)	9.4 (48.9)	4.6 (40.3)	13.0 (55.3)
Mean daily minimum °C (°F)	−0.2 (31.6)	0.8 (33.4)	3.6 (38.5)	9.5 (49.1)	14.1 (57.4)	18.8 (65.8)	21.5 (70.7)	20.5 (68.9)	17.3 (63.1)	11.9 (53.4)	6.5 (43.7)	1.6 (34.9)	10.5 (50.9)
Average precipitation mm (inches)	24 (0.9)	57 (2.2)	28 (1.1)	24 (0.9)	28 (1.1)	17 (0.7)	4 (0.2)	6 (0.2)	11 (0.4)	36 (1.4)	38 (1.5)	27 (1.1)	300 (11.7)
Average rainy days	6	8	8	5	6	3	1	2	4	6	8	7	64
Source: NCEI

== Administrative divisions ==
The municipality of Salyan consists of the city of Salyan. The mayor, presently Rüstam Xalilov, embodies the executive power of the city.

=== List of City's mayors ===
==== Azerbaijani SSR ====
- (1920) Yusif Gasimov
- (1961–1966) Huseyn Huseynov

==== Azerbaijan Republic ====
- (1993) A.Yusubov
- (1993–2004) Valihat Azizov
- (2004) Yusif Alakbarov
- (2004–2009) Rasim Bashirov
- (2009–2011) Aliagha Huseynov
- (2011–2016) Tahir Karimov
- (2016–2024) Sevindik Hatamov
- (2024–present) Rüstam Xalilov

== Culture ==
=== Sport ===
Salyan was home to former football teams Plastik Salyan and Mughan. Mughan through its history played in the Azerbaijan Premier League.

== Transport ==
Bus Terminal

=== Public transport ===
Salyan has a large urban transport system, mostly managed by the Ministry of Transportation.

== Notable residents ==
Some of the city's many prestigious residents include: philosopher Ali bey Huseynzade, mathematician Vagif Guliyev, lieutenant general Rail Rzayev, poet Khalil Rza Uluturk and footballer Samadagha Shikhlarov.

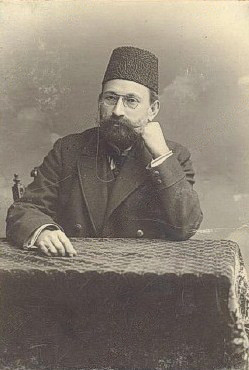
Ali bey Huseynzade, was the creator of the modern Flag of Azerbaijan.

== Sister cities ==
- Kahramanmaraş, Turkey

== Sources ==
- Bournoutian, George (2016). The 1820 Russian Survey of the Khanate of Shirvan: A Primary Source on the Demography and Economy of an Iranian Province prior to its Annexation by Russia. Gibb Memorial Trust. ISBN 978-1909724808.
