= Mostafa Khan of Shirvan =

Last Khan of Shirvan (1768–1844)

Khan of Shirvan
- Reign: 1792–1820
- Predecessor: Qasim Khan
- Successor: Khanate abolished
- Born: 1768; Shamakhi, Shirvan Khanate
- Died: 17 September 1844 (aged 75–76); Mustafaxanlı, Russian Empire
- Burial: Yeddi Gumbaz Mausoleum, Shamakhi
- Issue: Javad khan Shirvanski
- House: Sarkar
- Dynasty: Khanchobani
- Father: Aghasi Khan
- Mother: Bibikhanim, daughter of Safarali Sultan
- Religion: Sunni Islam

Mostafa Khan of Shirvan (Persian: مصطفی خان شیروانی, romanized: Moṣṭafā Khān Shirvānī; Russian: Мустафа-хан Ширванский; 1768 – 17 September 1844) was the last Khan of Shirvan under Russian suzerainty. He ruled the Shirvan Khanate from 1792 until his deposition by General Yermolov in August 1820. Known to the Russian army as "the bearded serpent of Shirvan," he was simultaneously one of Russia's most important vassals and, in Russian commanders' private assessments, one of the most difficult to control. His khanate, the largest in the Caucasus by population, submitted formally to Russia in 1805 but was never fully integrated into the imperial administrative system during his lifetime.

Loyal to Russia from 1803, he was deposed on accusations that every formal Russian investigation found unproven. He kept his stated promise not to take up arms against Russia — until six years of Persian exile left him no alternative. He entered Russian allegiance a second time in 1831 and settled in Karabakh, where he died in 1844. He never returned to Shirvan.

== Background and early life ==
Mostafa Khan was born in Shamakhi in 1768, the son of Aghasi Khan of the House of Sarkar, a branch of the Khanchobani tribe, and of Bibikhanim, daughter of Safarali Sultan. His father Aghasi Khan was executed on the orders of Fath Ali Khan of Quba in 1788. Following his father's death, the young Mostafa fled together with his cousins Askar and Qasim (sons of his uncle Muhammad Said Khan) to seek protection from neighbouring rulers.

According to the Russian-Armenian officer Averian Serebrov, who was dispatched to the region in 1796, the young princes were briefly arrested by Shabaddin Sultan of the Arash Sultanate acting on instructions connected to Fath Ali Khan, but a loyalist of the House of Sarkar spread a rumour that disrupted the escort and they were released, making their way first to the Avar Khanate and then to Karabakh, where they enjoyed the protection of Ibrahim Khalil Khan. The historian Abbasgulu Bakikhanov records that both the Karabakh and Shaki khans later came to the princes' aid, besieging New Shamakhi for a prolonged period, though the siege ultimately failed.

=== Struggle for Shirvan ===
Fath Ali Khan of Quba died in April 1789 (New Style), removing the principal obstacle to the Sarkar family's return. The sequence of rule that followed was contested: according to Serebrov, upon hearing of Fath Ali Khan's death, Askar Khan arrived with armies from Karabakh and seized Shamakhi, executing a rival claimant installed by Muhammad Hasan Khan of Shaki. Bakikhanov's account differs, stating that Askar Khan was installed as khan among the nomadic clans (ilat) while Mostafa withdrew to Alvand, his father's former base.

Askar Khan's rule proved brief and contested. Bakikhanov records that only six months into Askar Khan's tenure, the Shirvan nobility grew disillusioned with his passivity and shifted their support to his brother Qasim Khan. Qasim Khan — Mostafa's cousin on the paternal side — then administered Shirvan for a period.

== Rule of Shirvan ==
=== Early reign ===
In 1792, the Shirvan nobility led by Yüzbashi Bey Hovzi and Omar Sädäri invited Mostafa to come from Alvand and raise the banner of government in Shamakhi. Mostafa Khan established himself as Khan of Shirvan, displacing Qasim Khan which coincided with the devastating invasion of Agha Mohammad Khan Qajar. Mostafa was among the rulers who didn't accept Agha Mohammad's claim to shahdom who in turn sent 12,000-strong army under Mostafa khan Davalu-Qajar, a Qajar commander with task of conquering Shirvan. Besieging Mostafa in Fit-Dagh, he was accused by the local elders of looting and oppression. Which caused his recall by the shah. However, Mostafa's loyal Khanchobani tribesmen ambushed and killed him on the road in 1793. Enraged shah sent his half-brother Ali-Qoli Khan Qajar as his replacement to Shirvan. Unable to withstand the pressure, Mostafa submitted to Agha Mohammad.

Mostafa Khan's earliest documented approach to Russia dates to 1800. Facing a threatened Persian military expedition — ordered by Fath-Ali Shah (referred to in Russian sources as Baba Khan) in retaliation for Mostafa Khan's interception of a bride convoy destined for the Shah — he sent envoys seeking imperial protection. The background to this episode was that Ibrahim Khan of Karabakh had promised his daughter Agha Baji both to Mostafa Khan and to Fath-Ali Shah; when Ibrahim Khan's daughter was dispatched to Tehran, Mostafa Khan intercepted the convoy on the road with armed men. This act of defiance, combined with his earlier refusal to acknowledge Persian sovereignty — he had dismissed the Shah's envoy with the reply: "Tell your master that the Shah's pen is also mine" — made a Persian punitive expedition probable.

In July 1800, General Knorring reported to St Petersburg that "the Shirvan Mostafa Khan and the Sheki Mahomed-Hasan Khan" wished to be under Russian imperial protection. Tsar Paul I's rescript of 24 August 1800 [O.S. 12 August] consented to this request.

=== Russo-Persian War (1804–1813) ===
Formal subjection to Russia came in 1803, under General Pavel Tsitsianov, however, Mostafa was unwilling to come to sign terms in person. As result, Tsitsianov took a punitive expedition to Shamakhi, in the meantime, he wrote a letter to Ibrahim Khan and asked him to send a 1000-strong army under his son Mehdiqoli and Dmitry Lisanevich. Mostafa Khan ambushed their army with 80 horsemen who managed to wound two cossacks on 23 December 1806 but nevertheless defeated. A treaty was concluded on 6 January 1806 [O.S. 25 December 1805] at the foot of Fit-Dagh. The negotiation was conducted on Mostafa Khan's terms: Russian troops were required to halt at a distance from the city and the meeting took place at a specially prepared venue outside the walls. Mostafa Khan had hoped Russia would recognise a Shirvan enlarged to the boundaries of the medieval Shirvanshahs; Tsitsianov made clear this was not on offer and reportedly threatened to replace him with a more compliant member of his family if he refused. Under the treaty as concluded, Mostafa Khan accepted Russian suzerainty and an annual tribute of 8,000 chervonets; in return, Russia recognised his possession of Salyan under Article 5 of the agreement. He was confirmed in the rank of Lieutenant-General in the Russian imperial service. His formal declaration read:

"I, Mostafa Khan of Shirvan, in my name and that of my heirs, remove myself forever from the vassalage or honors of Persia (Iran) or any other state. I declare before the entire world that I do not recognize anyone as my liege, except His Imperial Majesty, the Emperor of All the Russias and His heirs to the throne. I promise to be a loyal slave to that throne. I swear this by the Holy Qur'an."

When Tsitsianov was killed at Baku in February 1806, Mostafa Khan was attacked by a contingent sent by Abbas Mirza following month, soon arrived with Hossein Khan Sardar. They took Shamakhi on August 24 and managed to under Esma'il Khan Damghani and Amanullah Khan Afshar to forcibly move 6,000 nomadic families (ilat) from Shirvan and resettled them in Qarajadagh and the Mughan plain, which were under firmer Persian control. He subsequently re-established relations with Russia and asked for reinforcements from Russian army, effectively foreclosed any return to the Persian fold.

Leaving Fit Dagh, Mostafa Khan invaded Salyan which was under occupation of Mir Baqer, brother of Mir-Mostafa Khan of Talysh. Capturing 300-strong Talysh army, Mostafa Khan didn't hesitate to boast about it. "The Persian blood he shed" in 1806 was a fact subsequently cited by Russian commanders as the most reliable guarantee of his loyalty: he had made enemies he could not afford to change sides to.

Throughout the period 1809–1816, Mostafa Khan repeatedly refused to send the cavalry contingents Russia demanded, accumulated large tribute arrears, and fortified Fit-Dagh as a refuge. He transformed the mountain plateau into a fully functioning city in 1810, establishing it as khanate's capital, resettling 1,000 families and establishing arms factories and specialized artisan districts. He granted these residents total tax immunity to ensure their loyalty and the city's self-sufficiency.

These behaviours, while consistent with the assertive autonomy he had always maintained, were increasingly read by Russian commanders as signs of insubordination. Several commanders conducted formal investigations; all found the charges of treason unproven. General Tormasov issued a comprehensive exoneration in 1811. General Paulucci rebuilt the relationship from 1812 onward, managing to reconstruct trust without resolving the underlying tensions. In April 1816, Paulucci authored a secret memorandum recommending the eventual abolition of the khanate when an opportune moment presented itself — simultaneously continuing to maintain cordial relations with Mostafa Khan in his official correspondence.

Mostafa Khan also contributed positively to Russian intelligence operations: in 1813 he personally unmasked an Ottoman spy (Shakh-Suvar-bek) who had penetrated his court. His conduct during the grain crisis of 1812 and the Kakhetian revolt of the same year was assessed by commanders as fully loyal.

=== Later reign ===
The appointment of General Aleksei Yermolov as Commander-in-Chief of the Caucasus in 1816 initiated the final phase of the khanate's existence. Yermolov's October 1817 circular to the Caucasian khans deliberately excluded Mostafa Khan — an early signal of his exceptional status in the new commander's assessment. In January 1818, Yermolov opened with a warm letter; by September of the same year, he had already begun military contingency planning for Mostafa Khan's removal, conveyed in a letter to Major-General Alexei Pestel commanding Russian forces in the Quba region.

The escalation from goodwill to deposition occupied roughly two years. In July 1818, Mostafa Khan voluntarily handed over seven letters he had received from Persia and Yermolov expressed no concern. By August of the same year, a crisis had emerged: it came to light that Pestel had been maintaining correspondence with Qasim Khan — the cousin Zubov had installed as Khan of Shirvan in 1796 before Mostafa Khan's return expelled him. Yermolov ordered the correspondence terminated at once, but the damage was done. For Mostafa Khan, even the existence of such a channel was existentially alarming, since deposition and replacement had already happened to him once. In January 1819, Yermolov sent him what appeared to be a congratulatory letter on the punishment of Avar rebels but which contained a veiled warning legible only to a careful reader. The abolition of the Sheki Khanate in July 1819 made the template explicit; by November Russian staff had already drafted an administrative schedule for Shirvan provincial government. In April 1820 Yermolov petitioned the Emperor to override the treaty rights on Salyan — an act that struck at the financial foundation of Mostafa Khan's rule four months before the deposition itself.

A covert intelligence operation against Mostafa Khan was conducted from Nukha. Documents report a spy visit in which an agent observed Mostafa Khan failing to raise his hat when the Emperor's name was mentioned — a gesture treated as evidence of disaffection.

Mostafa Khan was keenly aware of his situation. In 1818 he stated his own position to Madatov: "No one on a ship starts a fight with the helmsman. I have been on the ship of the Russian Monarch for twelve to fifteen years — treason is therefore impossible." He had also stated that if Russia decided to remove him, he "would obey even that without grumbling" but would "never have resolved to arm himself against so powerful a state as Russia."

=== The deposition ===
In August 1820, realising that his position had become untenable, Mostafa Khan fled rather than fight. He departed on the night of 30–31 August 1820 [O.S. 18–19 August] from the village of Sulut, crossed the Kura River at Mollakənd, and was received on the Persian side by Shahseven Ata-Khan with a cavalry escort of 800 men. He took with him approximately 300 men, several wives, and his treasury. The fortress of Fit-Dagh had refused him entry before the flight, and the deposition was entirely bloodless "without a single shot," in Yermolov's phrase.

Mostafa Khan thus kept his stated promise: he fled rather than fought. Yermolov's public account of the deposition was communicated to the Russian ambassador in Constantinople, Stroganov, with the politically convenient claim that Mostafa Khan had previously fled to Akhaltsikhe (Ottoman territory) during the 1796 episode. Subsequent archival documents — including a formal 1842 memorial note from the Caucasian Committee — consistently state that in 1796 he had fled to Karabakh, not Akhaltsikhe; the Akhaltsikhe reference appears designed for the Ottoman ambassador's benefit.

The khanate was immediately abolished and placed under Russian provincial administration. The property of all those who had fled with him was confiscated.

== In exile ==
Mostafa Khan arrived in Tabriz by September 1820, where he was received at the court of Abbas Mirza, the Persian crown prince and de facto commander of Persian Azerbaijan. He was placed on a regular salary alongside other exiled Caucasian rulers, including Surkhay-Khan of Kazikumukh and the Georgian Tsarevich Alexander. In January 1821, he was ordered to move from Meshkin to Karadagh, near the Erivan Sardar.

His decade in Persian exile followed a pattern documented in detail in Russian diplomatic correspondence: periodic cross-border raids by his men, complaints from Yermolov to Abbas Mirza, Persian promises of restraint, and continued inaction. Russia formally complained of his raiding activity in December 1822; intercepted a seditious letter from him in July 1823; and continued to receive intelligence of his border activities through 1824 and 1825.

In June 1825, Abbas Mirza assured Mostafa Khan's son Teymuraz bek that "war with Russia is inevitable" and promised to restore the family's rule in Shirvan. Teymuraz had quarrelled seriously with his father in 1825 and visited Abbas Mirza to complain; the crown prince reconciled them.

=== Pre-war period (1825–1826) ===
In September 1825, Russian intelligence obtained a Persian strategic plan specifically concerning Mostafa Khan: he was to flee through Shirvan into Dagestan to aggravate unrest there during the anticipated war, not merely to reclaim his former khanate. Prince Madatov, after learning of the plan, personally committed to having him "captured or killed" if he attempted to cross through Shirvan.

In March 1826, six of Mostafa Khan's named retainers attempted a crossing of the Araz at the village of Qaradonlu; one of the party drowned and the others withdrew on sighting Russian guard posts. Later that same month, Abbas-Mirza summoned Mostafa Khan to Khan-Bagh, his garden palace near Tabriz, for a command conference. According to intelligence received by Russian officers, Mostafa Khan "out of fear did not go"; after a follow-up order directing him to appear after the Persian New Year, he remained "apprehensive." This documented reluctance — Mostafa Khan as a fearful, unwilling participant rather than an eager Persian instrument — is the only surviving evidence of his personal attitude toward Abbas-Mirza's summons on the eve of the war.

In April 1826, Abbas-Mirza issued formal orders to Mostafa Khan and Yusuf Khan of Karadagh to raise forces for the coming war with Russia. By 6 July 1826, he had been summoned to receive a dedicated operational detachment — cavalry and infantry already assembled — for the Shirvan mission.

=== Occupation of Shirvan (1826) ===
On 18 July 1826, Mostafa Khan crossed into Shirvan with Persian cavalry as part of the coordinated multi-front Persian offensive — the same day Abbas-Mirza's main force of some 60,000 men with thirty guns entered Karabakh. A Persian document — a letter of Mullah Mir-Aziz dated 26 July 1826 — confirms from the Persian side that he had been "dispatched to Shirvan" under Persian orders. On 23 July, as his forces approached the Kura at Javad and Salyan, the entire Shirvan province went over to him — at least initially, the population transferred allegiance voluntarily before Persian military force established firmer control. On 26 July, his co-commander Husayn-Quli-Khan of Baku separated from him at Salyan to advance on Baku, while Mostafa Khan's 500-cavalry vanguard pressed on to Ağsu.

The occupation was accompanied by severe plundering: Yermolov's subsequent report noted that Persian officials and cavalry committed "terrible plunderings" and that Mostafa Khan recruited local beks and elders by permitting them to plunder the common people. The common people, by contrast, were held in submission by Persian military force rather than personal loyalty. He established a personal grain magazine of 1,500 puds at Old Shemakha and began driving nomadic populations toward the Kura — a deliberate asset-denial and population-removal operation planned before his own eventual retreat. He also maintained a functioning patrol cordon through Shirvan, blocking Russian communications, and sent reports via his kalabek (steward of the castle) Mirza Muhammad Qasim to Fath Ali Shah. His own letters during this period reveal him functioning as a communications node within the Persian command network — writing to Hosein Qoli Khan of Baku to relay that Abbas-Mirza was sending 12,000 sarbaz reinforcements.

On 8 August 1826, Major-General Karl von Krabbe moved against him with a force of four companies and four guns divided into two columns. The engagement — fought at Gürcüvan, on the heights of Koipa — found Mostafa Khan commanding a force estimated at up to 4,000 troops, a mixed force of Shahseven cavalry and Shirvan collaborators. Russian troops suffered 69 casualties (21 killed, 48 wounded); Mostafa Khan's forces retreated toward Nukha. The battle was a Russian tactical victory but a strategic draw: the assessment in Russian operational records was that the victory had brought "no advantages whatsoever." Mostafa Khan had planned to outflank von Krabbe by occupying the road to Kuba — which would have severed the Russian line of retreat while Persian sarbaz arrived from the south — but von Krabbe retreated to Kuba before the manoeuvre could be executed. The Russian retrospective acknowledged that "if Mustafa had forestalled us on the Kuba road and the sarbaz had arrived in time, the position of the detachment would have been unenviable." In September 1826, he was in the Budug magal, a mountain district northeast of Shemakha, where he actively recruited from the highland communities to rebuild his forces.

In late September 1826, news of the Russian victories at Shamkhor and Elisavetpol prompted his first withdrawal: he fled southward from the Budug magal on the night of 23–24 September and crossed the Kura at Salyan. He then returned briefly to Old Shemakha to continue recruiting from the mountain magals, but on the night of 5–6 October, learning through his forward posts that von Krabbe's detachment had advanced to within six versts of Old Shemakha on the Pirsaat stream, he departed via New Shemakha for the Javad crossing on the Kura. On the night of 6 October he crossed the Kura at Javad; the pontoon bridge collapsed under the press of the crossing, scattering the movement and confirming the disorganised character of the retreat. The Shirvan beks who had remained with him wept as they accompanied him on the road; his brother Hashim Khan, by contrast, was with von Krabbe's force and sent Shirvan cavalry to intercept and turn back the nomadic population being driven toward Persia. Eyewitness testimony establishes that the Shah had specifically ordered him to remain in Shirvan — to keep the sarbaz with him, not take the population to Persia, and hold his ground — and that he disobeyed this order, abandoning the sarbaz and fleeing on his own initiative.

Mostafa Khan then held the right bank of the Kura–Aras confluence for two further weeks with the remaining sarbaz (approximately 1,500 men and four guns) and a rope-pontoon bridge he had constructed, keeping a bridgehead in technically Russian territory. On 14 October 1826, Colonel Mishchenko's pursuit detachment — which had covered over 75 versts in approximately two days — reached the confluence and engaged his forces in the Battle of Javad. Russian artillery fire knocked out two of his four guns; he fled in disorder up the Araks toward Aslanduz; the remainder of his sarbaz retreated toward Ardabil. Russian losses were one officer (Captain Porkin) and a handful of others; the pontoon bridge infrastructure was captured and repaired for Russian use.

In August 1826, Yermolov had issued an operational order to General Karl von Krabbe: pursue Mostafa Khan with all available forces; execute beks who had aided him or taken up arms; "spare the common people, guilty solely through stupidity." After the Battle of Javad, around 22 October, General Paskevich conducted a cross-Aras operation near Aslanduz in which Mostafa Khan was struck by a musket ball and wounded in the arm. Paskevich simultaneously dispatched Major Polyakov on a special mission to capture him; the operation failed when Polyakov became lost in the mountains. He recuperated in the Dakilinski magal on the Persian side of the Aras, while a Shahseven commander known as Shukhur agha maintained Shirvan cavalry patrols along the Aras bank in his name.

By late November 1826, around Karapashali on the Aras, he had assembled a coalition force — Haji-Khan of Sheki's remnants (son of Salim Khan), Shukur-aga's Shahsevens, approximately 2,000 sarbaz, 4,000 cavalry, and four guns — with which he conducted a marauding across the Aras on 25–27 November, sending a detachment of 75 cavalry and Kurdish auxiliaries across below Maralyan into Karabakh. At the end of November, he opened negotiations with Qajars for a financial arrangement to maintain his forces and secure pickets: offered 2,000 tomans, he counter-demanded 3,000, and the negotiation collapsed when neither side conceded. By 14 December 1826, he was in the Karadagh province of Persia with the Shirvan beks who had accompanied his flight — a location he had pre-prepared by sending household goods there as early as August 1826. On 19 December 1826, Yermolov formally directed that the Shirvan families "forcibly taken across the Kura by Mostafa, the former Khan" be welcomed back, while the beks who had accompanied and profited from the occupation were excluded from the amnesty.

A subsequent judicial inquiry — conducted by Artillery Colonel Ivan Bukharin and reviewed by Auditor-General Kabenin in March 1831 — found that 74 people had been executed in Baku and Quba provinces in the reprisals following the 1826 revolt. Kabenin's review concluded that few of those executed had deserved capital punishment; most had been convicted solely on the word of beks or nukers without proper judicial inquiry. General Paskevich, questioned in April 1830 about the legal basis for Yermolov's delegation of capital powers to von Krabbe, gave an evasive response that implicitly acknowledged the orders had been legally questionable.

=== Operations of 1827 ===
In May 1827, Ivane Abkhazi — commanding in the Karabakh sector under Paskevich — reported to his superior that Mostafa Khan had been observed closely watching the return of Mehti-Kuli-Khan of Karabakh to Russian allegiance, and was signalling that he wished to seek the same terms. Paskevich received the report but had no policy authorisation to respond; the matter was not pursued further. Simultaneously, Mostafa Khan continued active Persian military service. In July 1827, he co-commanded an attack on Salyan together with Mir-Hasan Khan, leading a combined force estimated at 6,000–8,000 men; the attack disrupted Russian supply convoys on the Kura and the Russian fishing station at Bozhiy Promysl was burned. On 6 September 1827, he commanded a force of 4,000 cavalry across the Aras at Maraliyan under the nominal authority of Muhammad Mirza (son of Abbas-Mirza, later Shah Muhammad Shah), executing a marauder raid through the Askeran gorge and Jebrail area; the Russian pursuit force arrived too late to intercept.

=== Continued exile and the Turkmenchay aftermath ===
The Treaty of Turkmenchay (February 1828), which ended the war, included a clause specifically prohibiting Mostafa Khan from residing in Persian Azerbaijan. Despite this, in February 1829 Paskevich reported to Foreign Minister Count Nesselrode that "the former master of Shirvan, Mustafa-Khan, who is forbidden by the treaty from residing in Azerbaijan, came to our border, to the Mugan steppe, and held consultations with persons known for their ill-disposition toward Russia." The incident appeared in the same despatch as a coordinated attack by Mir-Hasan Khan on the Russian village of Astara.

By 1830, he made his first formal approach to return to Russian allegiance, petitioning Prince Dolgorukov at Ardabil. A second petition followed in October 1830, in which he asked that the matter be kept in absolute secrecy from the Persians: "disclose to no one, so that none of the Persians may learn of it."

In June 1831, the Emperor personally sanctioned his return; Nikita Pankratiev was authorised to set his residence and personal allowance at discretion. Major-General Stepan Zhukovsky wrote to Mostafa Khan with full logistics: cross the Aras, observe a fifteen-day quarantine at the gardens of Jabrayil, then proceed to Shusha. When Pankratiev's emissary Shamir khan Beglyarov reached him at the locality of Shukurlu — where he was at that moment in the company of the Persian prince Bahram Mirza — Mostafa Khan acknowledged the Imperial consent "with warm prayers for the welfare of His Imperial Majesty" but postponed the crossing, citing reasons communicated only verbally. He was, as he wrote to Pankratiev, "risking his life" in his determination to return.

Simultaneously, Persian authorities dispatched Kerim khan of Tabriz with 200 mounted men to pursue him through "all his hiding places" and deliver him to Tabriz. An order was also issued for him to be held under guard at Urmia, inland and away from the Russian border, separated from his sons. Neither measure succeeded.

== Return to Russia and final years ==
On 6 November 1831 [O.S. 25 October], Mostafa Khan crossed the Aras River from the locality of Shukurlu into Mugan, bringing approximately 400 families with him. He relocated initially to Budak-Tugai on the Araks border while a quarantine was arranged. He arrived in Tiflis on 3 February 1832 [O.S. 22 January] with thirteen beks and thirty-four nukers; the cost of maintaining his retinue exceeded forty roubles per day.

Baron Rosen, Commander-in-Chief in Tiflis, managed the settlement process and personally observed Mostafa Khan during his first months in Tiflis. He noted "the strictness of his principles and firmness of character" and explicitly stated that he could not find him "a complete traitor." General Kotlyarevsky, who had assessed him during the earlier period, sent Rosen a personal testimonial: Mostafa Khan was "devoted and loyal to Russia, straightforward and truthful."

The definitive Imperial settlement was confirmed in August 1832: residence in Karabakh, between the Aras and the Kura; a pension of 5,000 chervonets per year in total (1,000 personal, 600 for his wives, 2,400 for his sons), distributed among twelve sons; and integration of his sons into the Russian imperial military establishment. His son Javad Khan participated in the Chechen campaign of 1832 with a detachment of thirty-five riders and was awarded a silver sabre for bravery. In 1833, two younger sons, Javad Khan and Mammad Khan, were sent to Saint Petersburg under the escort of Major Beglyarov, who was himself awarded the Order of St. Stanislaus (3rd class) for his services.

Mostafa Khan continued to petition for permission to return to Shirvan. Each petition was refused: the standard grounds were that his voluntary departure in 1820 had forfeited his property rights, and that his large retinue made resettlement in a fully integrated Russian province impossible. In October 1836, Baron Rosen wrote to him declining yet another such petition and advising him to release his bek retinue to return to Shirvan independently and reclaim their own property.

In 1838, he is recorded as still alive in Karabakh and was called upon, alongside the deposed Mehti-Kuli-Khan of Karabakh, to give personal testimony confirming the customary (non-hereditary) nature of bek village tenure under the former khanates.

Mostafa Khan died on 17 September 1844. His sons petitioned for restoration of the paternal estate following his death. The Caucasian Committee declined the petition, ruling that the peasants of the former khanate had been under state administration for twenty-eight years and could not conveniently be returned to private ownership.

He was buried at the Yeddi Gumbaz Mausoleum in Shamakhi, the city of his birth.

== Legacy and character ==
Contemporary Russian commanders who dealt with Mostafa Khan directly left assessments that are, with the exception of the Yermolov period, remarkably consistent. General Knorring described him as "a man of middle years, vigorous, brave, tireless, just, and free from greed, and therefore, naturally, beloved by his subjects." General Gudovich consistently described his conduct as "praiseworthy loyalty." General Tormasov issued a comprehensive exoneration. General Kotlyarevsky offered the most consistent defence among the field commanders, arguing in multiple dispatches that Mostafa Khan's loyalty was secure and needed only to be sustained by expressions of trust — while simultaneously acknowledging his strategic centrality to Russian control of the eastern Caucasus flank. General Paulucci identified his structural position more clearly than any other commander: his enmity with Persia, cemented by the 1806 campaign and the blood he had shed, made him genuinely unable to seek Persian protection — a more reliable guarantee than any oath. Baron Rosen, observing him in 1832 after a lifetime of dealings with the Russian imperial system, noted "the strictness of his principles and firmness of character" and could not find him "a complete traitor."

Several character traits were consistent across all sources and all periods. Mostafa Khan was constitutionally distrustful of written commitments, preferring to conduct all sensitive business verbally. This pattern was confirmed as late as 1831, when he communicated his reasons for delaying the border crossing only through his emissary, refusing to commit them to writing. He was noted for verbal precision and rhetorical directness. In 1818 he stated his own position to Madatov: "No one on a ship starts a fight with the helmsman. I have been on the ship of the Russian Monarch for twelve to fifteen years — treason is therefore impossible." In his 1830 petition to Prince Dolgorukov he attributed his deposition to "certain persons, carried away by the force of passions, having misconstrued my zeal as treason," and characterised the years since as "a difficult and wearisome wandering."

He also, by general consensus, kept his word. He had stated in 1818 that he would obey removal without grumbling and would never take up arms against Russia; he fled rather than fought in 1820, exactly as promised, and took up arms only in 1826 after six years in Persian exile — and even then, Yermolov acknowledged that his behaviour in Shirvan was determined largely by Persian military forces rather than his own initiative. General Kotlyarevsky's 1832 testimonial "devoted and loyal to Russia, straightforward and truthful" echoed assessments made decades earlier by commanders who had observed him directly, and was consistent with Baron Rosen's conclusion after three months of personal observation in Tiflis that he could not find him "a complete traitor."

The common people of Shirvan appear to have shared this judgment. Multiple Russian commanders noted that the Shirvan population had been "carried along by force" during the 1826 occupation; they returned voluntarily to Shirvan after his flight, while the beks and elders who had materially benefited from the occupation through the plunder-licences he had granted them fled with him. Eyewitness accounts confirm that the Shirvan beks who did accompany him wept as they bade him farewell — an indication of genuine personal loyalty coexisting with the coercion he had employed. Despite his severity, he was remembered by subjects as compassionate (Persian: دردمند) and generous to those in need. His inner circle included diverse advisors, notably the Armenian physician Gabriel-bek Tovmasov, whom he granted the title "Khan of Fit" and entrusted with the management of Armenian resettlement within the khanate.

A striking aspect of his 1826 conduct — not previously documented in the available published record — is the behaviour of his full brother Hashim-Khan, whom von Krabbe described in October 1826 as "the most devoted to us brother of the fugitive Mustafa of Shirvan." Hashim-Khan served as the Russian military's primary local instrument for the pacification of Shirvan in October 1826 — advancing with Mishchenko's cavalry to the Marozinski post, reporting Mostafa Khan's flight from Old Shemakha, distributing amnesty proclamations, intercepting nomadic populations being driven toward Persia, and holding Salyan. He lost all his property in Talysh in the course of this service. His later posture of hostility toward Russia, documented in other archival series, belongs to a different political context and should not be read back onto his 1826 conduct.

Yermolov's published justification of the deposition identified the boat-crossing of Surkhay II as the decisive evidence of treasonable intent; this was a family connection (Mostafa Khan's wife Pakhay was Surkhay-Khan's daughter) and the act was discovered only after the deposition. Every formal Russian investigation from Tormasov's (1811) to Rosen's assessment (1831–32) found no overt treason proven.

As early as 1816, Paulucci had recommended abolishing the khanate at an opportune moment. He envisaged the simultaneous annexation of Shirvan and Karabakh as the necessary completion of Russian control over the south Caucasus. By 1818 Yermolov was planning militarily against Mostafa Khan in the same months that he was sending him warm letters. He described the problem of the khans collectively as requiring "the means of delivering ourselves from all the traitors at once." The financial incentive was substantial: direct imperial administration of Shirvan was projected to yield 45,000 chervonets per year, against the 8,000 tribute Mostafa Khan paid (and accumulated in arrears). The Salyan district alone yielded 15,500 chervonets annually, and Russia moved to override the treaty rights on it in April 1820, four months before the deposition. The abolition of the Shaki Khanate in July 1819 was the template; Shirvan followed thirteen months later.

At the time of Mostafa Khan's rule, the Shirvan Khanate was the largest of the vassal khanates in terms of population, comprising approximately 24,000 families and 120,000 male souls. The khanate's most valuable asset was the district of Salyan, a Caspian fishing port on the Kura River whose lease revenues substantially exceeded those of any comparable territory. By 1814 the Salyan lease was valued at 15,500 chervonets per year.

Mostafa Khan was a Sunni Muslim — an unusual characteristic among the khans of the southern Caucasus, most of whom were Shia. Russian commanders consistently identified his Sunni faith as a structural guarantee of loyalty: as Yermolov noted in 1818, his religious position made it politically impossible for him to seek Persian protection without incurring the hostility of his own people. His personal style was austere to the point of eccentricity: contemporary Russian reports describe him wearing tattered clothing, living in a simple dwelling, and eating coarse food, while permitting those around him to live in comfort. The Spanish officer Juan Van Halen, who visited Fit-Dag in May 1820 as a member of Prince Madatoff's staff, described him as "about fifty years of age, tall and corpulent, and of a robust constitution." Arif Shirvani was his court poet.

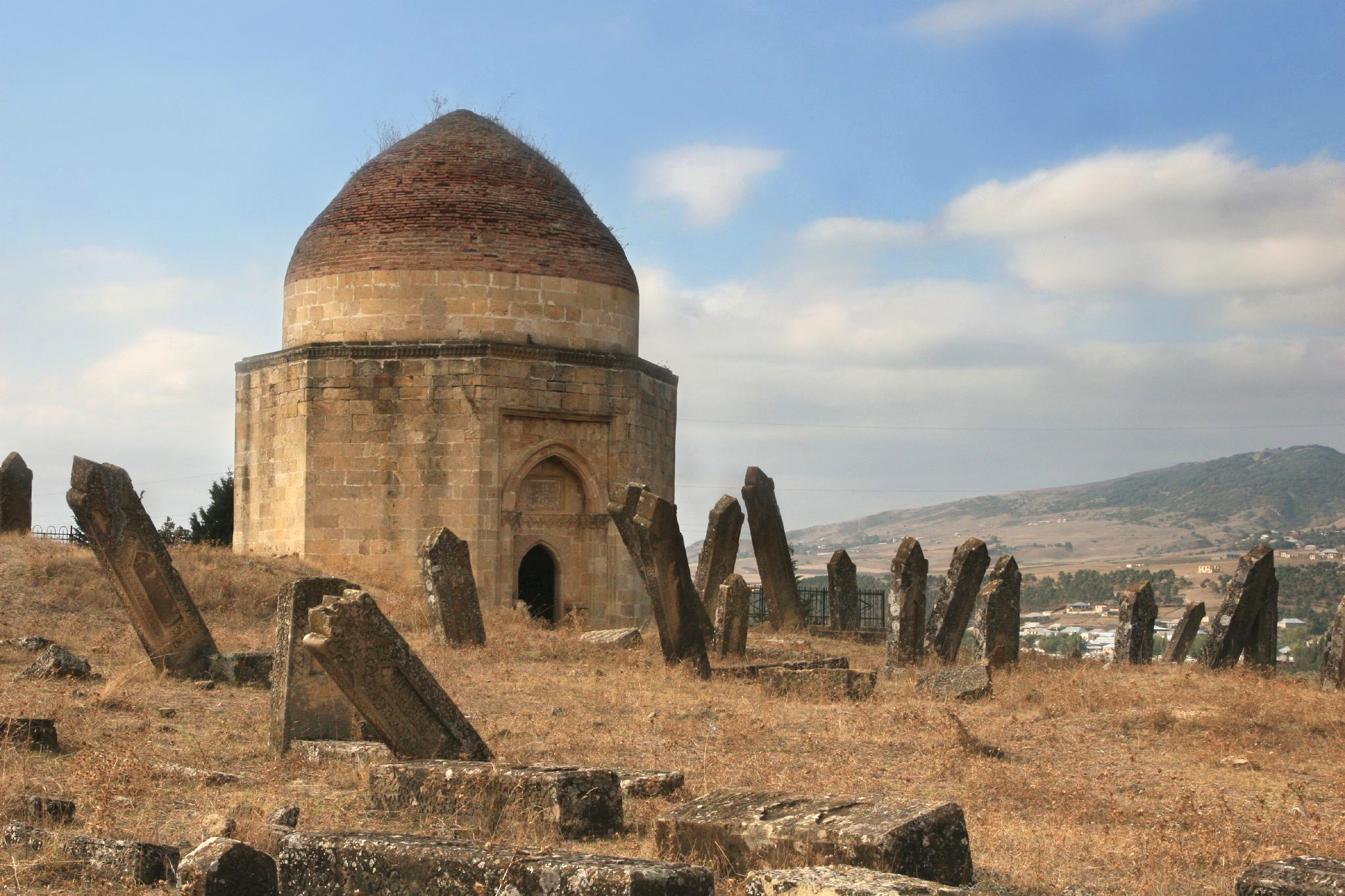
Yeddi Gumbaz Mausoleum complex, where most of Mostafa Khan's immediate family was buried.

== Family ==
The genealogy of Mostafa Khan's family is documented in detail in a set of genealogical tables published by Adolf Berzhe in 1873. Mostafa Khan had eight wives:

- Pari Jahan Bike (d. 1795) — daughter of Muhammadsalah Khan of Mughan; married 1789; buried in Kürkəndi
  - Teymuraz bek (1794—1842): former heir of Shirvan
- Yasaman (m. 1795, d. 1799) — bondwoman; buried at Yeddi Gumbaz
  - Aliqoli Bek (1798—1835)
- Mina Khanum (d. 1815) — bondwoman; married c. 1800; buried at Yeddi Gumbaz
  - Allahqoli Bek (1813—1870, Kurdamir)
- Gulandam Khanum (1801—1858) — Georgian bondwoman; buried at Yeddi Gumbaz
  - Jafar-Quli Khan (1803—1847): Governor of the Lahij district; quarrelled with his father during the Persian exile; visited Abbas-Mirza to complain; later reconciled
  - a daughter (b. 1814)
  - Javad khan (b. 1809): participated in the Chechen campaign of 1832 with 35 riders; awarded a silver sabre for bravery; commissioned cornet in the Caucasian Mountaineer half-squadron, 1834; reached Major-General rank by 1877
  - Mammad khan (b. 1820): enrolled in the 1st Cadet Corps, Saint Petersburg, 1834
  - Hidayat khan (b. 1827)
  - Badir Jahan Khanum (b. 1813)
  - Husni Jahan Khanum (b. 1814)
  - Ummi Salama Khanum (b. 1817)
  - Masuma Khanum (b. 1829)
  - Ummu Gulsum Khanum (b. 1834)
- Fatma Begüm (m. 1801; divorced 1810, d. 1838) — daughter of Hussein Khan of Shaki and a follower of Ismail Sirajuddin Shirvani.
- Asya Begüm (m. 1804, d. 1810) — daughter of Selim Khan of Shaki; buried at Yeddi Gumbaz
- Melik-khanum (m. 1810, d. 1832) — daughter of Melik-Mahmud of Alvand; buried at the Peygambar cemetery, Beylagan
  - Sara begüm (b. 1813)
- Pakhay-bike (m. 1814, d. 1847) — daughter of Surkhay-Khan of Kazikumukh; buried at Yeddi Gumbaz
  - Agha khan (1818—1884): reached Major-General rank by 1877
  - Suleiman khan (1820—1867), buried at Yeddi Gumbaz
  - Azad khan (1826—1861), buried at Yeddi Gumbaz
  - Karim khan (1828—1862), buried at Yeddi Gumbaz
- Melek-khanum (d. 1845) — a commoner; married 1839; buried at the Peyghambar cemetery, Mil Düzü
  - Amir-Aslan-Khan (b. 1842): youngest son, born in Russia

== Sources ==
- Berzhe, Adolf, ed. (1873). Акты, собранные Кавказскою Археографическою Комиссіею [Acts Collected by the Caucasian Archaeographic Commission] (in Russian). Vol. V. Tiflis. Genealogical tables of the Shirvan khans's families, pp. 1110–1118.
- Berzhe, Adolf; Kobyakov, D. A., eds. (1866–1904). Акты, собранные Кавказскою Археографическою Комиссіею [Acts Collected by the Caucasian Archaeographic Commission] (in Russian). Vol. 12 vols. Tiflis: Tipografiya Glavnogo Upravleniya Namestnika Kavkazskogo. Volumes 1–10 edited by Berzhe; volumes 11–12 edited by Kobyakov. Online at SHPL.
- Potto, Vasily, ed. (1900). "Материалы к истории Персидской войны 1826–1828 г.г." [Materials for the History of the Persian War of 1826–1828]. Кавказский сборник (in Russian). 21. Tiflis.
- Potto, Vasily, ed. (1901). "Материалы к истории Персидской войны 1826–1828 г.г." [Materials for the History of the Persian War of 1826–1828]. Кавказский сборник (in Russian). 22. Tiflis.
- Potto, Vasily, ed. (1902). "Материалы к истории Персидской войны 1826–1828 г.г." [Materials for the History of the Persian War of 1826–1828]. Кавказский сборник (in Russian). 23. Tiflis.
- Potto, Vasily, ed. (1903). "Материалы к истории Персидской войны 1826–1828 г.г." [Materials for the History of the Persian War of 1826–1828]. Кавказский сборник (in Russian). 24. Tiflis.
- Potto, Vasily, ed. (1906). "Материалы к истории Персидской войны 1826–1828 г.г." [Materials for the History of the Persian War of 1826–1828]. Кавказский сборник (in Russian). 25. Tiflis.
- Potto, Vasily, ed. (1907). "Материалы к истории Персидской войны 1826–1828 г.г." [Materials for the History of the Persian War of 1826–1828]. Кавказский сборник (in Russian). 26. Tiflis.
- Potto, Vasily, ed. (1908). "Материалы к истории Персидской войны 1826–1828 г.г." [Materials for the History of the Persian War of 1826–1828]. Кавказский сборник (in Russian). 27. Tiflis.
- Potto, Vasily, ed. (1908). "Материалы к истории Персидской войны 1826–1828 г.г." [Materials for the History of the Persian War of 1826–1828]. Кавказский сборник (in Russian). 28. Tiflis.
- Potto, Vasily, ed. (1910). "Материалы к истории Персидской войны 1826–1828 г.г." [Materials for the History of the Persian War of 1826–1828]. Кавказский сборник (in Russian). 30. Tiflis.
- Van Halen, Juan (1827). Narrative of Don Juan Van Halen's Imprisonment in the Dungeons of the Inquisition at Madrid, and His Escape in 1817 and 1818; to Which Are Added His Journey to Russia... Vol. II. London: Henry Colburn.
- Serebrov, Averian (1796). Istoriko-etnograficheskoe opisanie Dagestana [Historical and Ethnographic Description of Dagestan] (in Russian).
- Atkin, Muriel (1980). Russia and Iran, 1780–1828. Minneapolis: University of Minnesota Press. ISBN 978-0816656974.
- Bakikhanov, Abbasgulu agha; Floor, Willem M.; Ǧawādī, Ḥasan; Bāqīẖānli, ʿAbbās-Quli Aġā (2009). The heavenly rose-garden: a history of Shirvan & Daghestan. Washington, DC: Mage Publ. ISBN 978-1-933823-27-0.
- Bournoutian, George A. (2021). From the Kur to the Aras: a military history of Russia's move into the South Caucasus and the first Russo-Iranian war, 1801–1813. Iran studies. Leiden: Brill. ISBN 978-90-04-44515-4.
- Bournoutian, George A. (2016). The 1820 Russian Survey of the Khanate of Shirvan: A Primary Source on the Demography and Economy of an Iranian Province prior to its Annexation by Russia. Gibb Memorial Trust. ISBN 978-1909724808.
- Khalilli, Fariz (2019). Şirvan xanlarının şəcərəsi [Pedigree of Shirvan khans] (in Azerbaijani). Baku: Elm və Təhsil. ISBN 978-9952-8346-3-5.
- Tapper, Richard (1997). Frontier Nomads of Iran: A Political and Social History of the Shahsevan. Cambridge University Press. ISBN 978-0521583367.
- E'temad os-Saltaneh, Mohammad Hasan Khan (1883). Tarikh-e Montazam-e Naseri [The Naseri Chronological History] (in Persian). Vol. 3. Tehran.

Mostafa Khan of Shirvan House of Sarkar
Royal titles
| Preceded by Qasim Khan | Khan of Shirvan; 1792–1820 | Succeeded by Khanate abolished |
