= Javad khan Shirvanski =

Azerbaijani-speaking Imperial Russian general

Javad Khan Shirvanski
- Cavad Xan Şirvanski
- Born: c. 1812–1813; Shamakhi, Shirvan Khanate
- Died: after 1883 (aged 69–70); Cavadxanlı, Russian Empire
- Relatives: Mostafa Khan of Shirvan (father)
- Military career
- Allegiance: Russian Empire
- Branch: Imperial Russian Army
- Service years: 1832–1883
- Rank: Major general
- Units: Life-Guards, Caucasian-Mountaineer Half-Squadron
- Conflicts: Chechen Expedition (1832); Russo-Turkish War (1877–1878)
- Awards: Golden Weapon "For Bravery" (×2); Order of Saint Vladimir (4th class); Order of Saint Anna (3rd and 2nd class); Order of Saint Stanislaus (3rd class)

Javad Khan Shirvanski (Azerbaijani: Cavad Xan Şirvanski; Russian: Джавад Хан Ширванский; c. 1812/1813 – after 1883) was an Azerbaijani noble and general of the Imperial Russian Army, who descended from the ruling family of the Shirvan Khanate, who were Khanchobanis, to the rank of major general. He was the son of Mostafa Khan of Shirvan, the last independent Khan of Shirvan, and is called, by Azerbaijani sources, to be the first Azerbaijani to serve as a cornet in the Imperial Guards.

== Life ==
=== Origins and early years ===
Javad Khan was born in Shamakhi, the capital of the Shirvan Khanate, to Mostafa Khan of Shirvan and his wife Gulandam Khanum. According to the detailed family register compiled at the time of the 1820 deposition, Gulandam was an Armenian woman who had been taken captive as a young child during a Georgian campaign — she is described in Russian sources as of great beauty. He was one of the senior sons who fled with his father to Qajar Persia when Mostafa Khan was deposed and driven into exile in August 1820.

His birth year is given differently in different sources: the genealogical table compiled by Adolf Berzhe gives 1809, while a military service record held in the Russian State Military Historical Archive gives 1814. A third figure — approximately 1812 or 1813 — emerges from again Berzhe, where two separate documents dated February and July 1832 describe him as nineteen years old.

After his father's deposition, Javad Khan spent a period in Persia. He accompanied Abbas Mirza on military campaigns, including two years participating in the Khurasanian expedition in north-eastern Persia (1831–1832), gaining practical military experience before crossing back to Russian territory.

=== Return to Russia and early service ===
In July 1832, at around nineteen years of age, Javad Khan was sent by his father at the head of a Shirvan cavalry detachment to participate in a Russian military expedition against the mountain peoples of the Caucasus. This deployment served simultaneously as a demonstration of Mostafa-Khan's loyalty to the Russian government and as a formal introduction of his senior son to Russian military service.

On 28 March 1833, General-Adjutant Baron Rosen, Commander of the Separate Caucasian Corps and Chief Administrator of Georgia, awarded Javad Khan a silver sabre inscribed For Bravery in recognition of his conduct during the Chechen expedition.

On 6 April 1834, by Imperial command, Javad Khan was appointed cornet in the Life-Guards Caucasian-Mountaineer Half-Squadron of His Imperial Majesty's Own Escort — becoming the first Azerbaijani to serve in this capacity in the Imperial Guards. He also received 100 chervonets for initial equipment expenses. His younger brother Mammad Khan was simultaneously enrolled in the 1st Cadet Corps in Saint Petersburg.

On 27 February 1837, Javad Khan was transferred to the Life Guards Hussar Regiment. Later that same year, on 24 October, he was placed on leave with the rank of lieutenant for personal reasons. In 1838 he received the Order of Saint Anna, 3rd class with bow.

=== Later career and retirement ===
On 11 July 1839, Javad Khan re-entered service as a cornet (with seniority in rank counted from 18 December 1835) in the Life-Guards Hussar Regiment, with assignment to the Separate Caucasian Corps. He was awarded the Order of Saint Stanislaus, 3rd class. On 6 December of the same year he was promoted to lieutenant on a vacancy.

That same year, Nicholas I issued a named Imperial decree establishing the Honourable Muslim Command attached to the Corps headquarters — a combat Muslim cavalry unit formed as a convoy for the corps commander, with explicit orders that it be employed in military operations not only during expeditions but "in all cases where such a measure is found useful." Javad Khan served with this command, which on 28 December 1846 he commanded as its head holding the unit together with his appointment at corps headquarters.

In 1840, he received the Golden Weapon "For Bravery" — a second such distinction after the 1833 silver sabre. In 1841 he received the Order of Saint Vladimir, 4th class with bow, and was promoted to Stabsrittmeister.

From 6 December 1845 he held the rank of rotmistr, remaining attached to the Separate Caucasian Corps.

On 6 December 1855 he was promoted to colonel. The following year, as the Shemakha Governorate's representative at the coronation ceremony of Alexander II of Russia in Moscow, he was awarded the Order of Saint Anna, 2nd class with swords by Highest command.

On 21 December 1857, he was assigned to the Caucasian Army. Javad Khan participated in the Russo-Turkish War (1877–1878). On 8 November 1877, "for distinction against the Turks," he was promoted to major general with retention in the Caucasian Army and assignment to army cavalry. On 24 August 1883, General-Major Javad Khan Shirvanski was discharged from service on personal grounds with his uniform and a full pension.

== Personal life ==
Javad Khan derived income from estates in Shirvan and, notably, from the Khaki canal on the Mughan plain, of which he was the proprietor. He made a donation of 3,700 roubles to the charitable organisation established by Hasan bey Zardabi.

=== Family ===
He married Gawhar Begum (b. 1832), daughter of the lieutenant-colonel Husein beg Shikhalibeyli (his second cousin, 1797-1842), in 1849. They had the following children:

- Bala Khan Shirvanski (b. 1852)
- Amir Khan Shirvanski (b. 1854)
- Rashid Khan Shirvanski (b. 1857)
- Sitara Begum (b. 1860)

== Awards ==
- Silver sabre "For Bravery" (1833)
- Golden Weapon "For Bravery" (1840)
- Order of Saint Anna, 3rd class with bow (1838)
- Order of Saint Stanislaus, 3rd class (1839)
- Order of Saint Vladimir, 4th class with bow (1841)
- Order of Saint Anna, 2nd class with swords (1856)
- Promotion for distinction against the Turks (1877)
