= Lifeguard (disambiguation) =

A lifeguard is an emergency service worker.

Lifeguard or Life Guard may also refer to:

== Entertainment ==
- Lifeguard (film), a 1976 film starring Sam Elliott and Anne Archer
- The Lifeguard, a 2013 film starring Kristen Bell and David Lambert
- The Lifeguard (1980 film), a Soviet romantic drama film
- Lifeguard! Southern California, an American reality television series
- Lifeguard, a book by James Patterson
- The Lifeguard (novel), a 1988 novel by Richie Tankersley Cusick
- "Lifeguard", a short story in the collection Pigeon Feathers and Other Stories by John Updike
- Lifeguard (character), an X-Men character

== Military ==
- Life guard, a military elite or bodyguard unit in European countries
- Life Guards (United Kingdom), a British Army regiment
- Life Guards (Sweden), a Swedish Army regiment
- Royal Bavarian Life Guards, a Bavarian Army regiment
- Royal Life Guards (Denmark), a Danish Army regiment
- Washington's Life Guard, a short-lived Continental Army infantry and cavalry unit (1776–1783)
- Life Guards (France)
- Life Guards of Horse
- Life Guard Horse Regiment
- Life Guards Jager Regiment (Russia)

== Other ==
- Lifeguard (automobile safety), a 1956 safety package marketed by the Ford Motor Company
- Lifeguard (rail transport), a metal bracket placed ahead of a locomotive's wheels to deflect obstacles
- Life Guards' Dragoon Music Corps
- Life Guard DC
