= Battle of Javad =

Part of the Russo-Persian War

- Part of the Russo-Persian War (1826–1828)
Date	26 October 1826
Location	Javad, Shirvan Khanate, Russian Empire 40.0180°N 48.4555°E
Result	Russian victory
Territorial changes	Russian control of Shirvan consolidated

Belligerents
Russian Empire	Qajar Iran

Commanders and leaders
(Russian Empire) Colonel Pyotr Mishchenko	Mostafa Khan of Shirvan; Sararab Khan (WIA)

Strength
Infantry and cavalry (strength unspecified); 4 guns (6-pounder cannon and 12-pounder licorne howitzers)	~1,500 Persian regular infantry Cavalry horde 4 guns

Casualties and losses
1 officer killed (Captain Porkin/Perkin); 2 soldiers wounded, 1 contused 6 horses lost 2 muskets destroyed	2 artillery pieces lost Sararab Khan wounded Further losses described as "not inconsiderable"

The Battle of Javad was a military engagement of the Russo-Persian War (1826–1828), fought on 14 October [N.S. 26 October] 1826 at the confluence of the Kura and Aras rivers near the village of Javad. A Russian detachment under Colonel Pyotr Mishchenko defeated the combined forces of Mostafa Khan of Shirvan and accompanying Persian regular infantry, driving them from the right (Russian) bank of the Kura and effectively ending the Persian-backed military occupation of Shirvan that had begun in July 1826.

== Background ==
The Russo-Persian War (1826–1828) began in July 1826 when Persian forces under Crown Prince Abbas Mirza crossed the Aras River and invaded Russian-held territory in the Caucasus. The invasion was coordinated across multiple axes: the main Persian force advanced on Karabakh, while auxiliary operations were directed against Shirvan, Baku, and the Talysh coast.

Mostafa Khan of Shirvan had been the last ruling khan of the Shirvan Khanate before its annexation by Russia in 1820, when he fled across the Kura to Persian territory following his deposition by General Aleksey Yermolov. He spent the intervening years at the court of Abbas Mirza in Tabriz, and was mobilised as a political and military asset when the war began. A letter from a Persian commander, Mir-Aziz, dated 26 July [N.S. 7 August] 1826, confirms that Mostafa Khan was formally "dispatched to Shirvan" on Persian orders. His advance guard of approximately 500 cavalry had reached Agsu by 26 July [N.S. 7 August] 1826; the province of Shirvan went over to him on approximately 23 July [N.S. 4 August] 1826.

The first major engagement of Mostafa Khan's Shirvan campaign was the Battle of Gurjivan, fought on 8 August [N.S. 20 August] 1826. Mostafa Khan commanded a force estimated at up to 4,000 troops — including Shahseven cavalry and Shirvan irregulars near Gürcüvan. Major-General Karl von Krabbe led the Russian response with approximately 4 companies and 4 guns in a two-column night attack. The battle was a Russian tactical success — Mostafa Khan's forces were driven from the heights — but Russia gained no strategic advantage: Mostafa Khan retreated intact toward Nukha province, and the retrospective Russian assessment acknowledged the victory had produced "no advantages whatsoever." Russian casualties totalled approximately 69 (21 killed, 48 wounded); Mostafa Khan's losses were reported as "up to 250."

After Gurjivan, Mostafa Khan withdrew to the Budug mahal, a highland district of Quba Khanate, where he continued to recruit from the mountain mahals. He maintained a patrol cordon across Shirvan that disrupted Russian communications, preventing dispatches from reaching Russian commanders for weeks. On the night of 23–24 September [5–6 October N.S.] 1826, on receiving news of Russian victories at the Battle of Ganja and the Battle of Shamkhor, he fled southward in haste. By early October he had crossed the Kura at Salyan, briefly returned to Old Shamakhi to recruit further, and on the night of 5–6 [17–18 October N.S.] 1826 finally fled the city for the last time, making for the Javad crossing on the Kura.

== Prelude ==
On the night of 5–6 [17–18 October N.S.] 1826, Mostafa Khan crossed the Kura at Javad. A temporary bridge used in this hasty crossing either collapsed or was damaged in the press of the crossing. Between 6–14 [18–26 October N.S.] 1826, having returned to the right (Russian) bank with a detachment of Persian regular infantry, he constructed a more substantial rope-pontoon bridge (Russian: плавучий мост на канатах; Arabic: جسر, jasir) at the Kura–Aras confluence — the precise point where the two rivers meet before entering the Caspian Sea. This construction is independently confirmed by two separate source chains: Mishchenko's own dispatches and a contemporaneous intelligence letter from Ismail bey to Prince Valerian Madatov, written on 16 October [N.S. 28 October] 1826, which records that "the old jasir is broken, but Mostafa Khan has now built a new jasir."

With the bridge in place, Mostafa Khan held the right (Russian) bank as a deliberate defensive position. General Yermolov later noted, in a dispatch of 25 October [N.S. 6 November] 1826, confirming the position was intended to cover the passage of population and property into Persian-held territory. His force at this position comprised approximately 1,500 Persian regular infantry and his own Shirvan cavalry, with 4 artillery pieces. Mir-Hasan Khan of Talysh and the Shahseven commander Shukur aga were also present at or near the confluence.

On 13 October [N.S. 25 October] 1826, Colonel Pyotr Mishchenko departed from Agsu with his detachment, marching toward the Javad crossing. He covered more than 75 versts from midday of the 25th to the evening of the 26th. On the same day, 14 October [N.S. 26 October] 1826, General-Adjutant Ivan Paskevich separately issued orders to von Krabbe to advance toward Zardab and Javad, however the orders arrived after the battle had already been fought.

Mishchenko's force comprised riflemen of the Apsheron Infantry Regiment, Shirvan cavalry of the Caspian Naval Battalion, and 4 guns: 6-pounder cannon and 12-pounder licorne howitzers from the 3rd Light Artillery Company and 5th Reserve Battery. The cavalry had been substantially weakened throughout the October operations: a promised reinforcement of 300 cavalry from Aslan Khan had never materialised, owing to rebel threats against Kura villages, and Mishchenko's effective mounted strength was limited.

== The battle ==
Toward evening on 14 October [N.S. 26 October] 1826, Mishchenko's detachment found Mostafa Khan with his horde and Persian regular infantry on the right bank of the Kura at "the very place where it joins the Aras", modern Suqovuşan.

Upon the Russian approach, Mostafa Khan severed the pontoon bridge's ropes from the Persian (southern) side of the Kura, preventing Russian infantry and artillery from crossing while leaving the bridge partially intact. He then covered the bank he held with Persian infantry, brought 4 guns into action, and defended the crossing.

The Russian response was immediate: riflemen of the Apsheron Infantry Regiment occupied the bank opposite the bridge, while the 4-gun artillery opened fire. In a sustained exchange — over 3,500 rifle cartridges and 77 artillery rounds were expended — 2 of Mostafa Khan's 4 guns were knocked out. His forces, "struck by accurate fire from the riflemen and the batteries, retreated and fled in disorder." The onset of night, and the severed bridge that prevented Russian pursuit across the river, saved the retreating forces from destruction.

Mostafa Khan's forces abandoned on the field: 6 pack-boxes of rifle cartridges, 30 boxes of artillery charges of various calibres, 18 sacks of grenades, 107 shovels, 21 pickaxes, 4 axes, and 2 artillery wheels.

Russian losses were light but included a notable officer death. The commander of the Shirvan cavalry of the Caspian Naval Battalion, Captain Porkin had taken command of the Apsheron Infantry Regiment riflemen at the critical point opposite the bridge, was severely wounded, and died during the night of 14–15 [26–27 October N.S.] 1826. One private of the 3rd Light Artillery Company was wounded by grapeshot; one of the Apsheron Regiment by musket ball; one received a contusion. Six artillery horses were killed or seriously wounded; two muskets were destroyed by grapeshot.

Among Mostafa Khan's forces, Sararab Khan was confirmed wounded in the face by a musket ball; overall losses were described as "not inconsiderable." Two artillery pieces were captured.

== Aftermath ==
Mishchenko repaired the captured rope-pontoon bridge "with great effort to a serviceable condition." It was found suitable for the crossing of infantry and cavalry but too narrow for artillery transport. He crossed part of his infantry and cavalry onto the Mugan steppe to discover the enemy's traces.

Two individuals escaped to Mishchenko during and after the battle. Mustafa bey, naib (district administrator) of the Mugan mahal, had been taken prisoner by Mostafa Khan in Old Shamakhi and dragged along throughout the retreat; he escaped during the Russian advance on the evening of 14 October [N.S. 26 October] 1826. Yakov Yukhin, a Cossack of the Don Sysoyev Regiment and Russian prisoner of war, escaped during the night of 14–15 [26–27 October N.S.] 1826.

Mostafa Khan successfully reached Aslanduz, where he was placed in command of approximately 2,000 Persian regular infantry — a forward defensive deployment by Abbas Mirza covering the Aras line while the main Persian force withdrew to Tabriz. During a cross-Aras operation conducted by Paskevich approximately on 22 October [N.S. 3 November] 1826, Mostafa Khan was wounded in the arm by a musket ball. A capture attempt by Major Polyakov failed when the officer became lost in the mountain terrain.

Mishchenko maintained his detachment at Javad from 14 October [N.S. 26 October] 1826 to 5 January 1827 [O.S. 24 December 1826]. In early January he crossed to Karabakh with the main force (7 companies, 7 guns, 2 Black Sea Cossack regiments) to join Prince Madatov's detachment, leaving a wagon fort with 2 companies and 1 gun at Javad. With Mostafa Khan's forces expelled and the Persian infantry retreating to Ardebil, Russian reports noted: "to this day there is not a single villain in Shirvan."
