= Kalazeyva Mausoleum =

Historical burial monument in Ismayilli, Azerbaijan

Kalazeyva Mausoleum Kələzeyvə türbəsi

Religion
- District: Ismayilli

Location
- Location: Kalazeyva
- Country: Azerbaijan
- Interactive map of Kalazeyva Mausoleum; Kələzeyvə türbəsi

Architecture
- Established: 19th century

Kalazeyva Mausoleum (Azerbaijani: Kələzeyvə türbəsi) is a historical and architectural monument located in Kalazeyva village of Ismayilli District. Due to the location of an ancient cemetery and shrine in the village of Kalazeyva, the inhabitants of the surrounding areas also used here for burial.

== About ==
It is clear from the inscription on the wall on the left side of the entrance of the mausoleum that the monument was built in the first half of the 19th century on the graves of the family members of Mostafa Khan of Shirvan.

The main feature of the architecture of the tomb, which is about 6 meters high, is the high quality of construction work. The plan repeats the architecture of the tombs included in the Seven-Dome Tomb Complex in the solution of the internal volume of the octagonal tomb. Here, the transition from the octagonal base to the inner dome was made by means of small squinches similar to the ornamental squinches of the second tier.

The arches of both the inner niches and the entrance are arrow-shaped. Other details of the tomb, the profiles of the ledge and tsokol, the frames of the arches and other details reflect the new shapes created as a result of relations with Russia.
