= Shadow Mirror =

Shadow Mirror or Shadow-Mirror may refer to:

- Shadow Mirror (Novel), a 2010 paperback novel by Richie Tankersley Cusick
- Super Robot Wars, an element of the game series
