= Abdullah Khan Afshar =

Khan of Zanjan from 1782 to 1797

- Khan of Zanjan
- Reign: 1782 – 1797
- Predecessor: Ali Khan Afshar
- Successor: Amanullah Khan Afshar
- Born: Zanjan, Iranian Azerbaijan, Persia
- Died: Zanjan, Iranian Azerbaijan, Persia
- Abdullah Khan Usanli-Afshar
- Dynasty: Afsharid dynasty
- Religion: Islam

Abdullah Khan Afshar was the third khan of the Zanjan Khanate from 1782 to 1797.

Preceded by Ali Khan Afshar	Khan of Zanjan; 1782—1797	Succeeded by Amanullah Khan Afshar
