= Bahatdin Mirzayev =

Azerbaijani Red Army captain (1914–1987)

Bahatdin Shahveled oglu Mirzayev
- Bahəddin Şahvələd oğlu Mirzəyev
- Born: 31 December 1914; Sulut, Baku Governorate, Russian Empire
- Died: 15 April 1987 (aged 72); Baku, Azerbaijan SSR, Soviet Union
- Military career
- Allegiance: Soviet Union
- Branch: Red Army
- Service years: 1936–1938; 1941–1945
- Rank: Captain
- Unit: 416th Rifle Division
- Conflicts: World War II; Battle of the Caucasus; Battle of the Dnieper; Dnieper-Carpathian Offensive; Second Jassy–Kishinev Offensive; Vistula-Oder Offensive; Battle of Berlin
- Awards: Hero of the Soviet Union; Order of Lenin; Order of the Patriotic War, 1st class (2); Order of the Red Star

Bahatdin Shahveled oglu Mirzayev (Azerbaijani: Bahəddin Şahvələd oğlu Mirzəyev; 31 December 1914 – 15 April 1987) was an Azerbaijani Red Army captain and a Hero of the Soviet Union. During World War II, Mirzayev served as a battery commander in the 416th Rifle Division. During the Vistula–Oder Offensive, Mirzayev corrected the battery's fire and was wounded, reportedly enabling it to destroy multiple German firing points. On the next day his battery knocked out German artillery pieces which had been slowing the infantry's advance. Two days after the start of the offensive, his battery destroyed two German tanks and an armored personnel carrier, enabling the capture of the village. For his actions Mirzayev received the title Hero of the Soviet Union on 24 March 1945. He was seriously wounded in the Battle of Berlin and was discharged upon recovery. Postwar, Mirzayev worked as head of the militarized guard department at the Azerbaijan SSR Ministry of Communications.

== Early life ==
Mirzayev was born on 31 December 1914 in Sulut to a peasant family. He graduated from the eighth grade and a factory training school in Baku. He was drafted into the Red Army in 1936 and graduated from a course at the mountain artillery school in 1938. He was discharged from the Red Army in 1938.

== World War II ==
Mirzayev was redrafted into the Red Army in 1941. In 1942, he joined the Communist Party of the Soviet Union. He fought in combat with the 1054th Artillery Regiment of the 416th Rifle Division from November 1942. He was a platoon commander and later became a battery commander. He fought in the battles of Mozdok, Stavropol, and Taganrog. He fought in the August 1943 Donbass Strategic Offensive, which involved the crossing of the Mius. In September and October, he fought in the capture of Melitopol, part of the Battle of the Dnieper. On 11 December he was awarded the Order of the Patriotic War 1st class. Mirzayev received the Order of the Red Star on 4 January. Between January and February 1944 Mirzayev fought in the Nikopol–Krivoi Rog Offensive. He then fought in the Odessa Offensive, in which the 416th helped capture Mykolaiv and Odessa.

Mirzayev fought in the Second Jassy–Kishinev Offensive in the summer of 1944. In September the division was moved to the Magnuszew bridgehead on the Vistula. He fought in the Vistula-Oder Offensive, in which the division broke out from the bridgehead. On 14 January, during the breakthrough at Augustów, he corrected the battery's fire, enabling it to reportedly destroy seven German firing points and an infantry platoon. He was wounded, but remained on the battlefield. On 15 January, during the attack on Stromiec, the battery knocked out a tank and two self-propelled guns, enabling the advance of the infantry. On 16 January, during the battle for Białobrzegi, the battery reportedly destroyed two tanks and an armored personnel carrier, allowing the infantry to advance. On 24 March 1945 Mirzayev received the title Hero of the Soviet Union and the Order of Lenin.

Mirzayev fought in the storming of Kustrin and the Battle of Berlin. On 29 April he was seriously wounded.

== Postwar ==
After recovering from his wounds, Mirzayev was discharged. He lived in Baku and worked as head of the department of the militarized guard at the Azerbaijan SSR Ministry of Communications. On 6 April 1985 he received a second Order of the Patriotic War 1st class on the 40th anniversary of the end of World War II. Mirzayev died on 15 April 1987.
