= Şükürlü =

Şükürlü can refer to:

- Şükürlü, Çınar, Turkey
- Şükürlü, Jalilabad, Azerbaijan
