= Point Horror =

Book series

Point Horror is a series of young adult horror fiction books. The series was most popular among teenagers.

== History ==
The Point Horror series was launched in 1991 by Scholastic Inc, with the publisher re-releasing several of its previous Point titles under the Point Horror banner. Other books were published under the Point SF (science fiction) and Point Fantasy imprints.

Authors who published under the label of Point Horror include R. L. Stine, L. J. Smith, Diane Hoh, Richie Tankersley Cusick, Christopher Pike, and Caroline B. Cooney. The series was notable as Blind Date was one of R.L. Stine's first works and helped launch his career.

After an eight-year absence, Scholastic announced their plan to release three new titles in May 2013, with more to follow later in the year.

== Literary criticism ==
While the Point Horror series did not attract much serious attention, British children's novelist and literary historian Gillian Avery noted the series was "invariably structured around oppositions" in that teen horror novels "does not 'put an end to the opposition between the real and the imaginary' but, instead, affirms the distinction". Roy Fisher wrote the series embodied and represented "the fears and anxieties of young people about their lives in general and about school in particular". Others noted the series' similarity to Stephen King, saying that there "was little difference between the approach and design...other than length".

Will Davis of The Guardian attributed the decline of the series to higher standards from teen readers and the series' lack of real-life issues.

The series has received negative criticism for its portrayal of female characters. British educational historian Mary Hilton wrote in her book Potent Fictions: Children's Literacy and the Challenge of Popular Culture (Routledge, 1996) that many young readers viewed the female characters as the ones who get "upset, killed, or dumped".

== Offshoots ==
There have been three offshoots of the Point Horror series that, while all showing the "Point Horror" logo, are often regarded as separate series in their own rights. They are Point Horror Unleashed, Nightmare Hall and Mutant Point Horror. Nightmare Hall is unique amongst the offshoots as the entire series was written solely by Diane Hoh.

== Television ==
A television adaptation of Point Horror was reported to be in development as an anthology series for HBO Max since 2019.

== Publications ==
=== 1979 ===
- Avalanche (Arthur Roth, ISBN 0590422677)

=== 1980 ===
- When No One Was Looking (Rosemary Wells)

=== 1985 ===
- Slumber Party (Christopher Pike)

=== 1986 ===
- Blind Date (R. L. Stine)
- Weekend (Christopher Pike)

=== 1987 ===
- Twisted (R. L. Stine)
- Through the Hidden Door (Rosemary Wells)

=== 1988 ===
- The Lifeguard (Richie Tankersley Cusick)
- The Nightmare Man (Tessa Krailing)

=== 1989 ===
- Party Line (A. Bates)
- The Fog (Caroline B. Cooney)
- The Babysitter (R. L. Stine)
- Trick or Treat (Richie Tankersley Cusick)
- My Secret Admirer (Carol Ellis)
- Prom Dress (Lael Littke)
- The Rain Ghost (Garry Kilworth)

=== 1990 ===
- The Snow (Caroline B. Cooney)
- The Fire (Caroline B. Cooney)
- April Fools (Richie Tankersley Cusick)
- Final Exam (A. Bates)
- Funhouse (Diane Hoh)
- Beach Party (R. L. Stine)
- The Boyfriend (R. L. Stine)
- Teacher's Pet (Richie Tankersley Cusick)

=== 1991 ===
- Thirteen: 13 Tales of Horror - an anthology of short horror stories (these short stories are not published individually)
  1. "Collect Call" (Christopher Pike)
  2. "Lucinda" (Lael Littke)
  3. "The Guccioli Miniature" (Jay Bennett) - originally written and published in 1975.
  4. "Blood Kiss" (D. E. Athkins)
  5. "A Little Taste of Death" (Patricia Windsor)
  6. "The Doll" (Carol Ellis)
  7. "House of Horrors" (J. B. Stamper)
  8. "Where the Deer Are" (Caroline B. Cooney)
  9. "The Spell" (R. L. Stine)
  10. "Dedicated to the One I Love" (Diane Hoh)
  11. "Hacker" (Sinclair Smith)
  12. "Deathflash" (A. Bates)
  13. "The Boy Next Door" (Ellen Emerson White)
- Mother's Helper (A. Bates)
- Sister Dearest (D.E. Athkins)
- The Accident (Diane Hoh)
- The Babysitter II (R. L. Stine)
- The Cheerleader (Caroline B. Cooney)
- The Girlfriend (R. L. Stine)
- The Invitation (Diane Hoh)
- The Snowman (R. L. Stine)

=== 1992 ===
- Beach House (R. L. Stine)
- Fatal Secrets (Richie Tankersley Cusick)
- Freeze Tag (Caroline B. Cooney)
- Hit and Run (R. L. Stine)
- The Cemetery - previously released as The Ripper (D. E. Athkins)
- Mirror, Mirror (D. E. Athkins)
- The Dead Game (A. Bates)
- The Fever (Diane Hoh)
- The Hitchhiker (R. L. Stine)
- The Mall (Richie Tankersley Cusick)
- The Perfume (Caroline B. Cooney)
- The Return of the Vampire (Caroline B. Cooney)
- The Train (Diane Hoh)
- The Waitress (Sinclair Smith)
- The Window (Carol Ellis)

=== 1993 ===
- In Camera and Other Stories (Robert Westall)
- Camp Fear (Carol Ellis)
- Dream Date (Sinclair Smith)
- Halloween Night (R. L. Stine)
- Help Wanted (Richie Tankersley Cusick)
- Nightmare Hall 1 - The Silent Scream (Diane Hoh)
- Nightmare Hall 2 - The Roommate (Diane Hoh)
- Nightmare Hall 3 - Deadly Attraction (Diane Hoh)
- Nightmare Hall 4 - The Wish (Diane Hoh)
- Nightmare Hall 5 - The Scream Team (Diane Hoh)
- Nightmare Hall 6 - Guilty (Diane Hoh)
- The Dead Girlfriend (R. L. Stine)
- The Phantom (Barbara Steiner)
- The Stepdaughter (Carol Ellis)
- The Stranger (Caroline B. Cooney)
- The Vampire's Promise (Caroline B. Cooney)
- The Babysitter III (R. L. Strine)

=== 1994 ===
- 13 More Tales of Horror - an anthology of short horror stories (these short stories are not published individually)
  1. "The Cat-Dogs" (Susan Price)
  2. "The Piano" (Diane Hoh)
  3. "The Devil's Footprints" (Malcolm Rose)
  4. "Softies" (Stan Nicholls)
  5. "The House That Jack Built" (Garry Kilworth)
  6. "The Station With No Name" (Colin Greenland)
  7. "Something to Read" (Philip Pullman)
  8. "Killing Time" (Jill Bennett)
  9. "J.R.E. Ponsford" (Graham Masterton)
  10. "The Buyers" (David Belbin)
  11. "Closeness" (Chris Westwood)
  12. "The Ring" (Margaret Bingley)
  13. "Bone Meal" (John Gordon)
- Call Waiting (R. L. Stine)
- Driver's Dead (Peter Lerangis)
- Halloween Night II (R. L. Stine)
- Nightmare Hall 7 - Pretty Please (Diane Hoh)
- Nightmare Hall 8 - The Experiment (Diane Hoh)
- Nightmare Hall 9 - The Night Walker (Diane Hoh)
- Nightmare Hall 10 - Sorority Sister (Diane Hoh)
- Nightmare Hall 11 - Last Date (Diane Hoh)
- Nightmare Hall 12 - The Whisperer (Diane Hoh)
- Nightmare Hall 13 - Monster (Diane Hoh)
- Nightmare Hall 14 - The Initiation (Diane Hoh)
- Nightmare Hall 15 - Truth or Die (Diane Hoh)
- Silent Witness (Carol Ellis)
- The Witness (R. L. Stine)
- Twins (Caroline B. Cooney)
- The Diary (Sinclair Smith)
- The Forbidden Game 1: The Hunter (L. J. Smith)
- The Forbidden Game 2: The Chase (L. J. Smith)
- The Forbidden Game 3: The Kill (L. J. Smith)
- The Watcher (Lael Littke)
- The Yearbook (Peter Lerangis)
- I Saw You That Night! (R. L. Stine)

=== 1995 ===
- 13 Again - an anthology of short horror stories (these short stories are not published individually)
  1. "Anjelica's Room" (Laurence Staig)
  2. "Foxgloves" (Susan Price)
  3. "The Ultimate Assassin" (Malcolm Rose)
  4. "The Rattan Collar" (Garry Kilworth)
  5. "'Boomerang" (David Belbin)
  6. "The Delinquent" (Maresa Morgan)
  7. "The Ghost Trap" (Lisa Tuttle)
  8. "Close Cut" (Philip Gross)
  9. "Grandma" (Colin Greenland)
  10. "Vampire in Venice" (John Gordon)
  11. "Picking up the Tab" (Stan Nicholls)
  12. "Evidence of Angels" (Graham Masterton)
  13. "Hospital Trust" (Dennis Hamley)
- Hide And Seek (Jane McFann)
- Night School (Caroline B. Cooney)
- The Babysitter IV (R. L. Stine)
- The Body (Carol Ellis)
- The Boy Next Door (Sinclair Smith)
- The Claw (Carmen Adams)
- The Mummy (Barbara Steiner)
- The Surfer (Linda Cargill)
- Vampire's Love 1: Blood Curse (Janice Harrell)
- Vampire's Love 2: Blood Spell (Janice Harrell)

=== 1996 ===
- Amnesia (Sinclair Smith)
- Double Date (Sinclair Smith)
- Homecoming Queen (John Hall)
- Krazy 4 U (A. Bates)
- Prom Date (Diane Hoh)
- Second Sight (Sinclair Smith)
- Spring Break (Barbara Steiner)
- Sweet Sixteen (Francesca Jeffries)
- The Bride (D. E. Athkins)
- The Stalker (Carol Ellis)
- Unleashed - Blood Sinister (Celia Rees)
- Unleashed - Transformer (Philip Gross)

=== 1997 ===
- Unleashed - At Gehenna's Door (Peter Beere)
- Unleashed - The Carver (Jenny Jones)
- Unleashed - The Vanished (Celia Rees)

=== 1998 ===
- Unleashed - Catchman (Chris Wooding)
- Unleashed - Darker (Andrew Matthews)
- Unleashed - House of Bones (Graham Masterton)
- Unleashed - The Hanging Tree (Paul Stewart)

=== 1999 ===
- Unleashed - Eve's Party (Nick Turnbull)
- Unleashed - Facetaker (Philip Gross)
- Unleashed - The Ghost Wife (Susan Price)
- Unleashed - Skinners (John Gordon)

=== 2000 ===
- Unleashed - Amy (Samantha Lee)
- Unleashed - In Spirit (Nick Turnbull)
- Unleashed - The Bogle (Samantha Lee)
- Unleashed - Scissorman (John Brindley)
- Mutant - Carnival of the Dead (Laurence Staig)
- Mutant - Night of the Toxic Slime (Anthony Masters)
- Mutant - Ortho's Brood (Roger Davenport)
- Mutant - Dissolvers (Andrew Matthews)

=== 2001 ===
- Unleashed - Fright Train (Paul Stewart)
- Unleashed - Lowlake (Roger Davenport)
- Unleashed - The Cunning Man (Celia Rees)
- Mutant - Fly-Blown (Philip Wooderson)
- Mutant - Crawlers (Andrew Matthews)
- Mutant - Hair Raiser (Graham Masterton)

=== 2002 ===
- Unleashed - Moonchildren (Andrew Mathews)
- Unleashed - The Belltower (Samantha Lee)
- Unleashed - Welcome Stranger (Anthony Masters)

=== 2003 ===
- Demon (Samantha Lee)
- The Dark (Linda Cargill)
- The Unseen Part 1 - It Begins (Richie Tankersley Cusick)
- X-Isle (Peter Lerangis)

=== 2004 ===
- The Dark II (Linda Cargill)
- The Unseen Part 2 - Rest in Peace (Richie Tankersley Cusick)
- Return to X-Isle (Peter Lerangis)
- Demon II (Samantha Lee)

=== 2005 ===
- The Unseen Part 3 - Blood Brothers (Richie Tankersley Cusick)
- The Unseen Part 4 - Sin and Salvation (Richie Tankersley Cusick)

=== 2013 ===
- Defriended (Ruth Baron)
- Identity Theft (Anna Davies)

=== 2014 ===
- Wickedpedia (Chris Van Etten) - July 1st
- Followers (Anna Davies) - July 1
