= Lael Littke =

American writer

- Born: 1929 (age 96–97)
- Education: Utah State University; City College of New York
- Occupation: Author
- Spouse: George (died 1991)
- Children: 1
- Writing career
- Genre: Young adult literature

Lael Jensen Littke (born 1929) is an American author of young adult literature and around 75 short stories.

== Biography ==
Littke grew up in Mink Creek, Idaho and studied education and English at Utah State University.

While working in Denver, Colorado as a secretary, she met her husband George through their local congregation of the Church of Jesus Christ of Latter-day Saints. They moved to New York City, where she attended the City College of New York and her husband studied at New York University. They moved to California with their young daughter, Lori, when George was hired to teach political science at California State University, Los Angeles. Littke would teach at Pasadena City College and University of California, Los Angeles (UCLA). Her husband died in 1991.

Her first published pieces were for the Relief Society Magazine, Ellery Queen's Mystery Magazine, Ladies’ Home Journal, and Seventeen. She later began writing books, including titles for young adults and children, of which she has now published more than forty.

She has served on the board of directors for the Miller Eccles Study Group, and has also been active with Sunstone and Exponent II, publications about Mormon issues.

She currently resides in Pasadena, California.

== Publications ==
- Prom Dress (1989), Point Horror series
- Lucinda (1991), included in the Point Horror anthology Thirteen: 13 Tales of Horror)
- The Mystery of Ruby's Ghost (1992)
- The Watcher (1994), Point Horror series
- The Phantom Fair (1996)
- Haunted Sister (1998)
- Lake of Secrets (2002)
- Stories from the life of Joseph Smith (2003), coauthored with Richard Turley
- The Company of Good Women, 3 volumes (2006–08), coauthored with Nancy Anderson and Carroll Hofeling Morris
