= Diane Hoh =

American author of young adult horror (1937–2025)

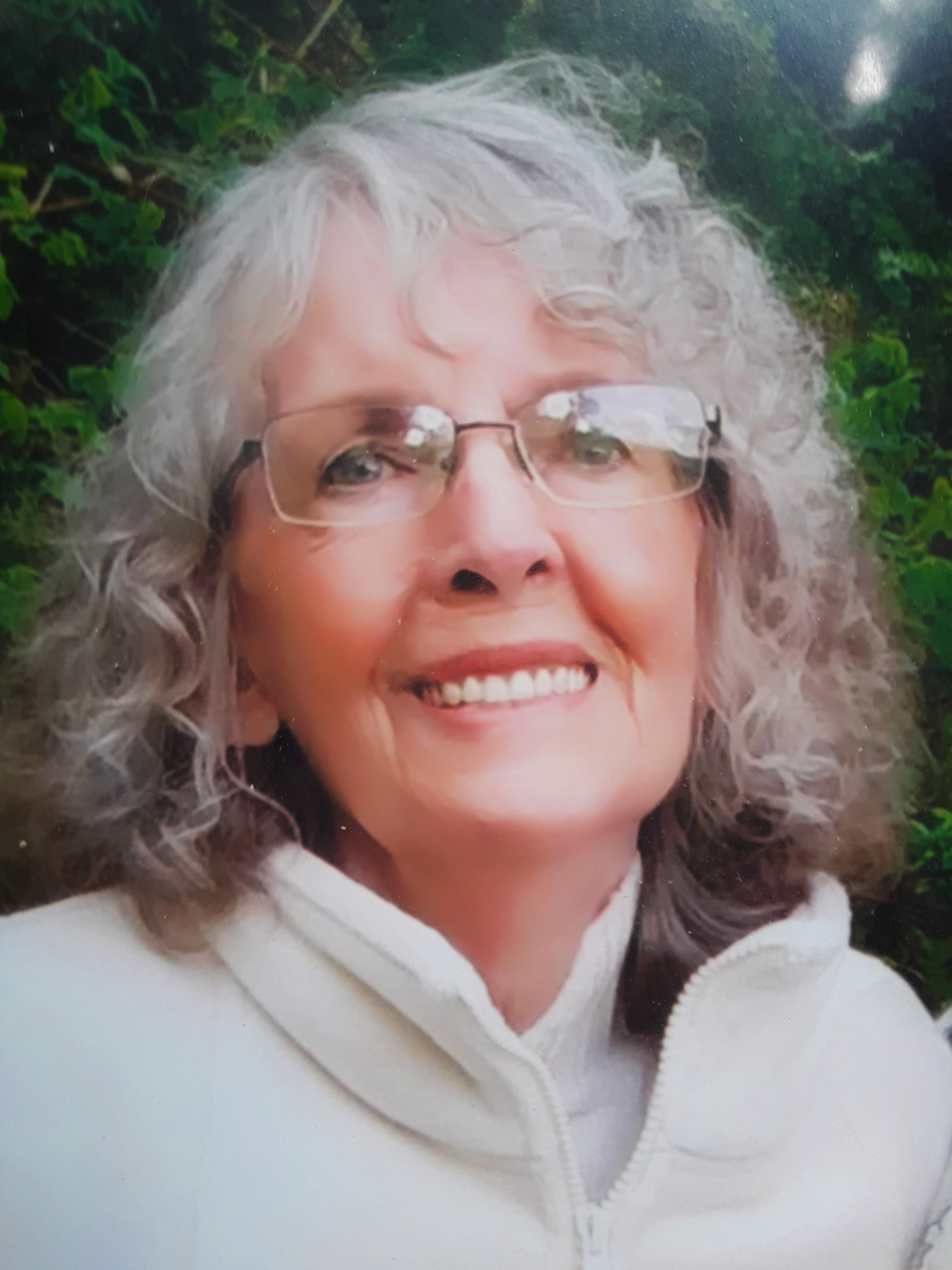
- Hoh in 2019
- Born: Diane Margot Eggleston Hoh; April 28, 1937; Warren, Pennsylvania, U.S.
- Died: August 25, 2025 (aged 88); Warren, Pennsylvania, U.S.
- Occupation: Author
- Writing career
- Years active: 1984–2000

Diane Margot Eggleston Hoh (April 28, 1937 – August 25, 2025) was an American author of young adult horror fiction, best known for her Nightmare Hall series and Point Horror novels. She grew up in Warren, Pennsylvania, and moved back there permanently in 2021 after 33 years in Austin, Texas. She died on August 25, 2025, at the age of 88.

== Reception ==
Reception to Hoh's work has been mixed to positive. Titanic: The Long Night was positively received by The Hamilton Spectator.

== Bibliography ==
=== Nightmare Hall ===
1. The Silent Scream (1993)
2. The Roommate (1993)
3. Deadly Attraction (1993)
4. The Wish (1993)
5. The Scream Team (1993)
6. Guilty (1993)
7. Pretty Please (1994)
8. The Experiment (1994)
9. The Night Walker (1994)
10. Sorority Sister (1994)
11. Last Date (1994)
12. The Whisperer (1994)
13. Monster (1994)
14. The Initiation (1994)
15. Truth or Die (1993)
16. Book of Horrors (1994)
17. Last Breath (1994)
18. Win, Lose or Die (1994)
19. The Coffin (1995)
20. Deadly Visions (1995)
21. Student Body (1995)
22. The Vampire's Kiss (1995)
23. Dark Moon (1995)
24. The Biker (1995)
25. Captives (1995)
26. Revenge (1995)
27. Kidnapped (1995)
28. The Dummy (1995)
29. The Voice in the Mirror (1995)

=== Med Center ===
1. Virus (1996)
2. Flood (1996)
3. Fire (1996)
4. Blast (1996)
5. Blizzard (1996)
6. Poison (1997)

=== Stand alone novels ===
- Brian's Girl (1985)
- Loving That O'Connor Boy (1985)
- Slow Dance (1989)
- Funhouse (1990)
- The Invitation (1991)
- The Accident (1991)
- The Fever (1992)
- The Train (1992)
- Prom Date (1996)
- Blindfold (1997)
- Don't Let Me Die! (August 28, 1998)
- Titanic: The Long Night (1998)
- Remembering the Titanic (1998)
- Blindfold (1999)

=== Anthologies ===
- Thirteen: 13 Tales of Horror by 13 Masters of Horror – ed. T. Pines; contains Hoh's short story Dedicated to the One I Love.(1991)

== See also ==
- List of horror fiction authors
