= Ali Khan Afshar =

Khan of Zanjan from 1780 to 1782

- Khan of Zanjan
- Reign: 1780 – 1782
- Predecessor: Zulfaqar Khan Afshar
- Successor: Abdullah Khan Afshar
- Ali Khan Zayirli-Afshar
- Dynasty: Afsharid dynasty
- Religion: Islam

Ali Khan Ashar was the second khan of the Zanjan Khanate from 1780 to 1782.

Preceded by Zulfaqar Khan Afshar	Khan of Zanjan; 1780—1782	Succeeded by Abdullah Khan Afshar
