= Walk of the Spirits =

Book by Richie Tankersley Cusick

- Author: Richie Tankersley Cusick
- Publisher: Penguin Group (USA)
- Publication date: April 2008
- Publication place: United States
- Media type: Print (Paperback)
- Pages: 336
- ISBN: 0-14-241050-0
- Followed by: Shadow Mirror

Walk of the Spirits is a 2008 American young adult romance and thriller novel written by author Richie Tankersley Cusick. It is followed by her novel, Shadow Mirror.

== Plot ==
When Miranda Barnes first sees the sleepy town of St. Yvette, Louisiana, with its moss-draped trees, above-ground cemeteries, and her grandfather’s creepy historic home, she realizes that life as she knew it is officially over. Almost immediately, there seems to be something cloying at her. Something lonely and sad and . . . very pressing. Even at school and in the group project she’s been thrown into, she can’t escape it. Whispers when she’s alone, shadows when no one is there to make them, and a distant pleading voice that wakes her from sleep. The other members in Miranda’s group project, especially handsome Etienne, can see that Miranda is in distress. She is beginning to understand that, like her grandfather before her, she has a special gift of communicating with spirits who still walk the town of St. Yvette. And no matter where she turns, Miranda feels bound by their whispered pleas for help . . . unless she can somehow find a way to bring them peace.
