= Arif Shirvani =

Azerbaijani-language poet

Arif Shirvani (Karbalai Allahi Arif; Azerbaijani: Arif Şirvani) (1786, Lahij – 1866, Irevan) was an Azerbaijani-language poet who lived in the 18th and 19th centuries. He was Mustafa Khan's palace poet.

Arif Shirvani mainly wrote ghazals and satires. In his works, he complained about the oppression and injustice of his time, the lack of a loyal confidant, and criticized the ruler of Shamakhi, Mustafa Khan and his courtiers.

He lived in the palace of Mustafa Khan (1792–1820), the ruler of Shirvan, and later, offended by him, he went to the palace of Iravan's khan, Huseyn Khan. The first collection of his work was published by Salman Mumtaz.
