= House of Sarkar =

Turkic dynasty

Sarkar
- House of Sarkar
- Country: Shirvan Khanate
- Founded: c. 1700
- Current head: ?
- Final ruler: Mostafa Khan of Shirvan
- Deposition: 1828

The House of Sarkar was a ruling clan of the Shirvan Khanate from the Khanchobany tribe. "Sarkar" means "tax collector," which hints at the profession of an early progenitor.

== Before reign ==
The first mention of the dynasty dates back to 1721, during Haji Davud's uprising, when he deposed the local ruler of Shamakhy who was a member of Sarkar clan. Upon founding of the Shirvan Khanate by Nadir shah in 1734, Allahverdi beg Sarkar controlled several towns. After Allahverdi beg died in 1767, his sons Aghasi Khan and Muhammad Said khan rose up against Hajji Muhammad Ali Khan, starting a diarchy in the Shirvan Khanate. Another brother Agharazi beg Sarkar was also mentioned as a ruler of a khanate with the ancient "Shirvanshah" title.

== Reign ==
The House of Sarkar ruled Shirvan until 1820. The following is a list of rulers:

1. Aghasi Khan & Muhammad Said khan Sarkar (together) (1763 - 1768 )
2. Aghasi Khan (1778 - 1786)
3. Askar Khan (1786 - 1789)
4. Qasim Khan (1789 - 1796)
5. Mostafa Khan of Shirvan (1796 - 1820)

== Decline ==
The last reigning member Mostafa Khan of Shirvan favored an expansionist policy which caught the attention of Russia. However, Khan submitted to Alexander I and was awarded the rank of general-lieutenant in 1805 while secretly attempting to maintain independence. He defected to Qajar Iran in 1820, which resulted in the disestablishment of his Khanate and its full incorporation to Russian Empire. Mustafa Khan managed to regain his throne in 1826 during the Russo-Persian War, but lost again in 1828 and was forced to live in Iran until his death in 1844, being buried in Shamakhy. Some of their descendants became military officers in the Imperial Russian Army such as Javad khan Shirvanski.
