= Zulfaqar Khan Afshar =

Khan of Zanjan from 1747 to 1780

- Khan of Zanjan
- Reign: 1747 – 1780
- Successor: Ali Khan Afshar
- Born: Zanjan, Iranian Azerbaijan, Persia
- Died: Zanjan, Iranian Azerbaijan, Persia
Names
- Zulfaqar Khan Amirli-Afshar
- Dynasty: Afsharid dynasty
- Religion: Islam

Zulfiqar Khan Afshar was the first khan of the Zanjan Khanate from 1747 to 1780.

Preceded by	Khan of Zanjan; 1747—1780	Succeeded by Ali Khan Afshar
