= Sərsurə =

- Location within Azerbaijan
- Coordinates: 40°44′N 48°27′E
- Country: Azerbaijan
- Rayon: Ismailli
- Municipality: Sulut
- Time zone: UTC+4 (AZT)
  - Summer (DST): UTC+5 (AZT)

Sərsurə (also, Sarsura) is a village in the Ismailli Rayon of Azerbaijan. The village forms part of the municipality of Sulut.
