= Nikolai Krabbe =

Nikolai Karlovich Krabbe
- Николай Карлович Краббе
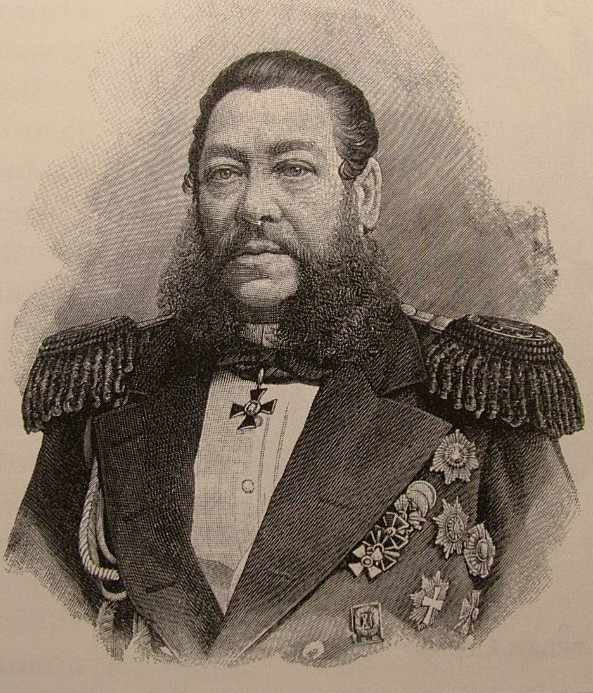
- Nikolai Krabbe
- Born: September 19, 1814; Tiflis, Georgia Governorate, Russian Empire
- Died: January 3, 1876 (aged 61)
- Relatives: Karl von Krabbe (father)
- Military career
- Allegiance: Russian Empire
- Branch: Imperial Russian Navy
- Service years: 1832-1874
- Rank: Admiral
- Commands: Minister of the Navy
- Conflicts: Crimean War
- Awards: Order of St. George 4th Class
- Other work: founded Obukhov Gun Foundry

Nikolai Karlovich Krabbe (Russian: Николай Карлович Краббе; September 19, 1814 – January 3, 1876) served as an admiral of the Russian Imperial Navy and as Minister of the Navy from 1860 to 1874. His father was Karl von Krabbe.

After graduating from the naval academy he joined (1830) the corps of navy cadets (Russian: гардемарины - gardemariny) and in 1832 was promoted midshipman in the Baltic Fleet, serving on the frigates Belton, Kulm and Oranienbaum. In 1836-1837 he was sent to the Caspian Sea, and participated in naval operations during the Caucasian War. His bravery during the war earned him the rank of lieutenant. In 1838 Krabbe was appointed the General Staff of the Imperial Navy as aide-de-camp to Prince L.S. Menshikov.

In 1839 he was sent to the Azov Sea to organize a naval expedition along the northern coast of the Black Sea, being in command of a squadron under admiral Mikhail Petrovich Lazarev, at that time the Commander of the Black Sea Fleet. He took part in General Vasily Perovsky's Khivan Expedition of 1839-1840. Promoted captain lieutenant in 1842, he was part of the Russian mission led by Captain Yevfimy Vasilievich Putyatin to Iran. Thereafter, in 1847, he was in charge of a naval expedition exploring the delta of the Syr Darya. He returned to the Black Sea Fleet in 1853, commanding a squadron under vice-admiral Lazar Markovich Serebryakov.

The same year he was promoted imperial aide-de-camp and appointed deputy director of the Ministry of Navy's Inspection Department. Two years later he became director of the department. He returned to active duty during the Crimean War of 1853-1856, coming back to the Ministry after the war. While working at the Inspection Department he was actively involved in the equipment of the vessels to be stationed in the delta of the Amur River, and in establishing the first Russian naval base in the Far East, on the Pacific Ocean.

His career continued rapidly: Nikolai Krabbe was promoted counter admiral în 1856, vice admiral in 1862 and admiral in 1869. In 1860 he was appointed Minister of the Navy, holding this position for 14 years. His main concern was the modernization of the Russian navy, especially naval artillery, and he was instrumental in the building of the Obukhovsky Steel Foundry (now Obukhov State Plant) for the production of naval guns. He also started modernizing the fleet from wooden vessels to metal-plated ships and from sailing ships to ships equipped with steam engines. He also made the arrangement for Grand Duke Alexei Alexandrovich's visit to the United States in 1871-1872.

In 1874 he was relieved of his duties as Minister of the Navy and appointed vice General Admiral of the Russian Imperial Navy. Nikolai Krabbe died on January 3, 1876.
