= Khanchobany (dance) =

Azerbaijani dance

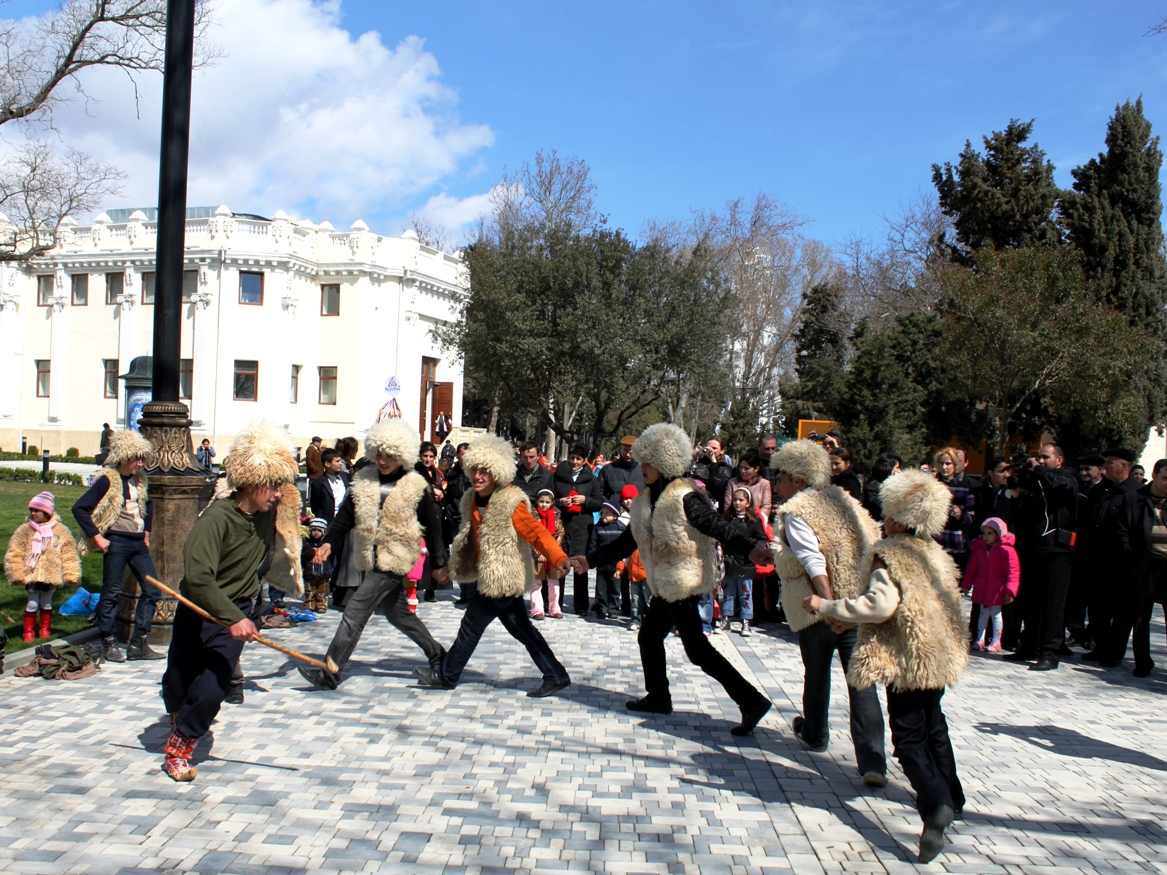
Performance of the dance during Nowruz holiday in Baku

Khanchobany (Azerbaijani: Xançobanı) – is a Khanchobani dance, performed by men to fast national music. It is also popular among Azerbaijanis.

== Origination ==
In the 17th and 18th centuries, a tribe called the Khanchobany settled in the Shirvan region of Azerbaijan. The dance named for them is performed in a tribe spirit. The dance originated in the late 19th century.

== Performance ==
The dance is performed both in weddings (mainly in village weddings) and during other holidays and concerts. It is performed only by men at a quick pace, with synchronized moves.
