= Blind Date (novel) =

1986 young adult novel by R.L. Stine

- First edition
- Author: R.L. Stine
- Language: English
- Genre: horror young adult
- Publisher: Point Horror; Scholastic Inc.
- Publication date: 1986
- Publication place: United States
- ISBN: 0590403265 (First edition)
- OCLC: 748825861

Blind Date is a 1986 young adult horror fantasy novel by R.L. Stine, and while written as a standalone, it was published as the first book in Scholastic's Point Horror series. The story follows Kerry, a young man who becomes obsessed with the sexy voice of a woman on his telephone despite having never seen her.

== Publication ==
Blind Date was one of R.L. Stine's first horror genre novels for young adults, written as a standalone prior to Stine's 1990s fame due to his Goosebumps book series (which was written for much younger readers). According to Stine, his publisher, Jean Feiwel, requested that he write the book after a feud with another author. Stine stated in an article for Time magazine, "I didn't know what she [Feiwel] was talking about. What is a horror novel for teenagers? So I had to run to the bookstore and buy up a whole bunch of books by Lois Duncan and Christopher Pike and see. Then I wrote this book, Blind Date. It was a number one best seller. I thought, wait a minute, forget the funny stuff — kids like to be scared. I've been scary ever since." The book was published in various print formats between 1986 (the year of the first edition's release) into the 2010s.

== Influence ==
Blind Date launched the Point Horror series, a Scholastic imprint brand by various authors and one of the first Scholastic brands to cater to the young adult horror genre. Stine has also often credited Blind Date as his transition from writing comedy to writing horror, as Blind Date was his debut horror novel.

== Reception ==
Blind Date received mixed reviews from critics. Publishers Weekly stated "though the plot is convoluted and some details are stomach-churning, Stine moves the story along, handling the red herrings with finesse." Lisa Marie Bowman of Through the Shattered Lens said "the story goes from one strange development to another. It makes for a kind of weird story that doesn't always make sense but it is compulsively readable. And really, that's the thing with the work of both Christopher Pike and R.L. Stine. You don't reread these books because they're particularly scary or even that well-written. You read them because they're just so damn strange. It's never enough to have just one twist. Instead, there has to be a dozen twists and if they don't really seem to make sense or go together ... well, so what? That's what life's like when you're a teenager, right? It may not always make sense. It may not always turn out the way you want. But it's still something you miss once it's gone."
