= Lifeguard! Southern California =

Lifeguard! Southern California is an American reality television series on The Weather Channel and narrated by Christopher Emerson which puts cameras on Southern California beaches from Los Angeles County in the north to San Diego County in the south. The cameras follow real life lifeguards and harbor patrol officers along 150 miles of Southern California beaches as they perform their rescue and law enforcement activities. The lifeguards tell of the people who come to their beaches, their jobs and the dangers that their beaches pose like water dangers (such as rip currents and high surf), and dangers presented by marine life (such as stingrays, jellyfish, and the occasional shark). All of the rescues, first aid and law enforcement shown are recorded by the cameras in real time. Victims and victim's families are also interviewed during the recording of the show.

The agencies profiled include, but are not limited to the Long Beach Harbor Patrol, lifeguards from the city of San Diego (such as La Jolla Cove, Black's Beach, Mission Beach, Pacific Beach) and Orange County, California cities (such as Newport Beach and Huntington Beach), also the local police and fire agencies for each jurisdiction the beach or harbor is located in.

The types of rescues include swimmers who are in above their head such as with rip currents, injuries from minor cuts and scrapes, missing swimmers, serious boating accidents and medical emergencies such as heart attacks. Law enforcement activities include everything from alcohol intoxication to boating violations and violent crimes committed on the beach.
