= Life Guard DC =

Condom distribution project

Life Guard DC is a Washington, DC, condom distribution program and part of The Condom Project, a Tides Center project that is driven by the involvement of peer-to-peer social networks, local businesses, and community-based organization outreach services to destigmatize condoms and to increase their use. The program distributes free condoms at local establishments in historically overlooked communities, 24 hours a day.

== HIV in Washington ==
Washington has the worst HIV/AIDS epidemic in the United States. 1 in 20 residents is living with HIV and 1 in 50 residents is living with AIDS. The epidemic is driven by sexual activity (both heterosexual and homosexual) and then by injected drug use. Latex condoms, when used correctly, are highly effective in reducing the risk of HIV transmission. Many stores and pharmacies in Washington, like CVS, keep condoms in locked cabinets which can deter people from purchasing them. Also, there are few business that sell or organizations that distribute condoms in the areas of Washington with the highest rate of HIV.

== DC Government response to the epidemic ==
The DC Appleseed Center for Law and Justice, a non-profit public policy organization, has harshly graded the District's response to the HIV/AIDS epidemic. The Center's report called condom distribution an "immediate priority". The city had planned to distribute 600,000 condoms in 2005 but only delivered 100,000.

== Life Guard's initiative ==
Life Guard was formed by a coalition of local non-profit organizations to provide condoms, specifically in areas with high HIV infection rates. Life Guard creates condom packages with lubrication, safe sex information and information on HIV/AIDS resources in Washington. These condom packages are placed at 24-hour businesses such as fast food places and laundromats. The program has already distributed more than 100,000 condoms. The program has received a lot of press for its innovative and simple way of tackling the HIV crisis. The organization uses simple ways to explain the organization and its goals, such as using YouTube.
