= Yeddi Gumbaz Mausoleum =

Mausoleum in Azerbaijan

Coordinates: 40.6203°N 48.6361°E

- Yeddi Gümbəz türbəsi
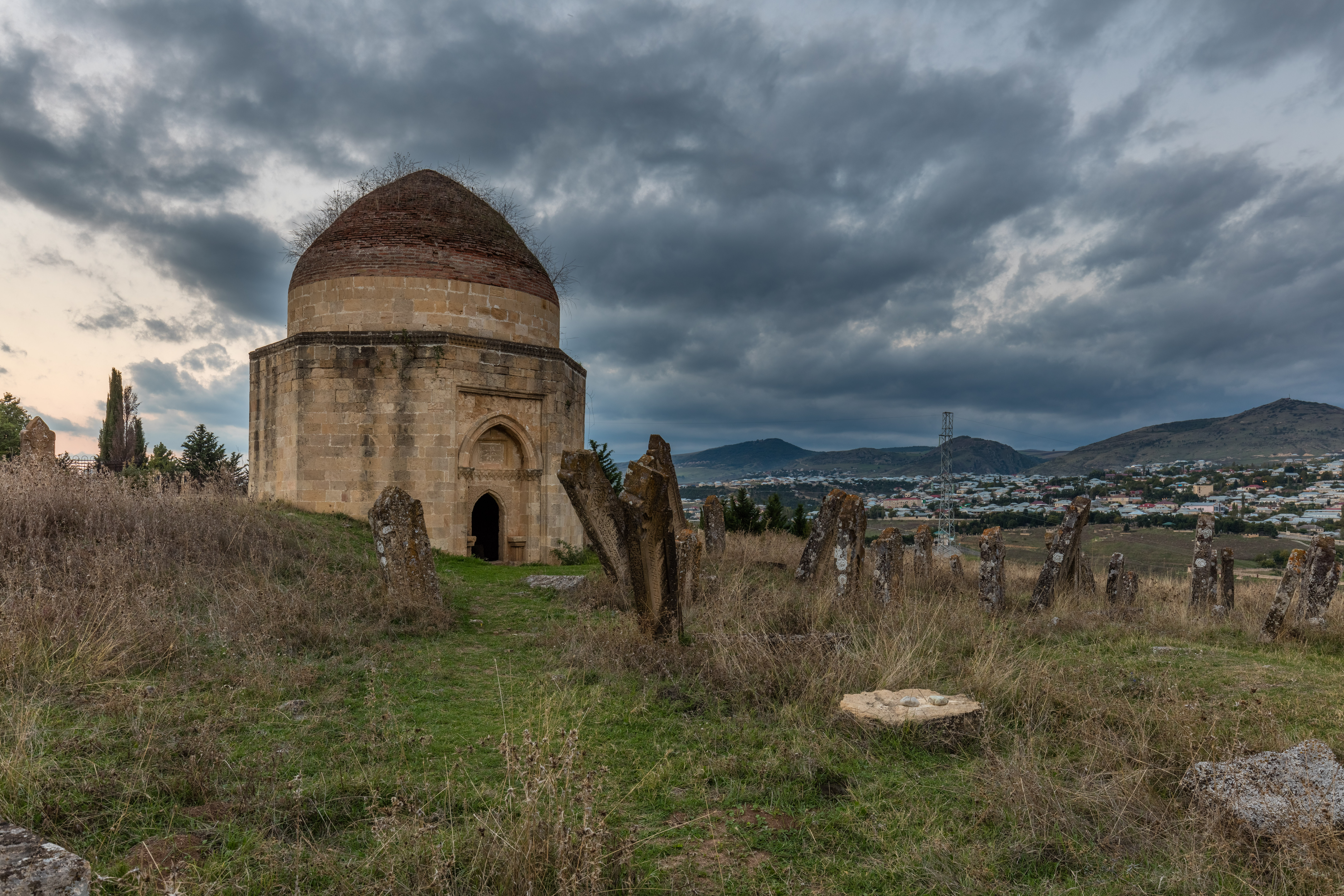
- Interactive map of Yeddi Gumbaz Mausoleum
- Location: Şamaxı, Azerbaijan
- Type: Mausoleum and cemetery

Yeddi Gumbaz Mausoleum – is a cemetery located 1.5 km south to Şamaxı where three mausoleums from “Yeddi Gumbaz” group are still saved. Other mausoleums of the group are partly destroyed and are without cupola or walls. The mausoleum belongs to the beginning of the 18th century. This architectural monument was built for a family of Mustafa khan – the last khan of Shamakhi. The name of the architect – ustad Taghi – is also known as there is an inscription on the mausoleum. The monument belongs to Shirvan-Absheron architectural school.

The most ancient of them is dated to 1810, which is testified by an inscription carved on the mausoleum. This mausoleum is eight-edged. Its external edges have niches, which are covered with arch shaped half-cupolas.

The octahedron turns to a hexahedron with the help of trumpet arches and then turns into a circle of the cupola with the help of angular rosettes. The cupola is distinguished for its trefoil arch. The trunk of the mausoleum is finished with a cornice made of black stone and built in the shape of simple muqarnasses. The spherical cupola is located on a high tholobate.

Both internal and external parts of the mausoleum are faced with white stone. The architectural composition of all three mausoleums has the same architectural features.
