= Kürkəndi =

- Municipality
- Location within Azerbaijan
- Coordinates: 40°01′57″N 48°29′08″E
- Country: Azerbaijan
- Rayon: Sabirabad

Population
  - Total: 1,878
- Time zone: UTC+4 (AZT)
  - Summer (DST): UTC+5 (AZT)

Kürkəndi (also, Kyurkendi) is a village and municipality in the Sabirabad Rayon of Azerbaijan. It has a population of 1,878.
