= Suqovuşan, Sabirabad =

Suqovuşan
- Municipality
- Location within Azerbaijan
- Coordinates: 40°01′29″N 48°29′17″E
- Country: Azerbaijan
- Rayon: Sabirabad

Population
  - Total: 2,133
- Time zone: UTC+4 (AZT)
  - Summer (DST): UTC+5 (AZT)

Suqovuşan (also, Suqovşan, Sukovushan, Sugovshan) is a village and municipality in the Sabirabad Rayon of Azerbaijan. It has a population of 2,133.
