= The Lifeguard (novel) =

1988 young adult novel by Richie Tankersley Cusick

- First edition
- Author: Richie Tankersley Cusick
- Language: English
- Genre: horror thriller
- Publisher: Point Horror; Scholastic Inc.
- Publication date: 1988
- Publication place: United States
- ISBN: 9780590432030 (First edition)
- OCLC: 18031342

The Lifeguard is a 1988 young adult horror thriller novel by Richie Tankersley Cusick. The story follows Kelsey, a teenage girl on a holiday vacation, who begins witnessing the unfolding signs of a serial murderer who drowns their victims in the sea. Written as a standalone novel, The Lifeguard was taken in by Scholastic and published as book #3 under the imprint Point Horror. The book received contrasting reviews from modern day critics, but in recent decades has become admired for its original first edition cover, which featured a wavy blue-and-orange aquatic title font and an artistic illustration of a creepy male lifeguard on the beach, popular as an example of nostalgic seapunk aesthetics and retro pop culture art.

== Plot ==
Kelsey Tanner, a young girl who recently grieved the death of her biological father, is given a summer vacation trip to Beverly Island (fictional location) with her mother and her mother's boyfriend, Eric, who has several children roughly Kelsey's age. Upon arriving on the island, Kelsey and her mother are informed by a horrified Eric that his only daughter, Beth, is missing. A search party has been called in to look for the girl after her belongings are found on the beach; meanwhile Kelsey befriends the other teenagers on the island, including Donna, a preppy girl, and Skip, a wealthy and vain boy who works as a lifeguard. Kelsey is put off by Neale, Eric's son and Beth's brother; Neale is cold, aloof and bitter, and Kelsey doesn't trust him.

It is decided by the search party later on that Beth must have drowned while swimming on the beach, although no corpse is ever recovered. Kelsey finds a note hidden in Beth's bedroom that says "I think someone is going to kill me". Kelsey begins to suspect that Beth was murdered, but is hesitant to tell her peers. She fears for her own life after she hears someone in her bedroom while she's alone in Eric's house, and later when she's about to leave the shower; she hears bizarre noises and notices wet footprints on the floor of the shower room, along with seaweed from the beach. Kelsey discovers a deceased body, but when she alerts her peers to it, the body has disappeared, leading the other teens to doubt Kelsey's sincerity. A creepy old man with an eyepatch, Isaac (a resident of Beverly Island off-season), keeps yelling warnings at Kelsey, terrifying her into thinking that he's some kind of a pervert who may have attacked and killed Beth. Kelsey develops romantic feelings for Justin, Eric's shy younger son and the brother of Neale and Beth, although she is also drawn to Neale despite his cold nature. Kelsey breaks into Isaac's houseboat and discovers items belonging to Beth, but before she can gather any of this evidence, a rat startles her and she flees the houseboat. She discovers that Justin left the note in Beth's room and that he has been listening to her telephone conversations. She also finds Isaac’s dead body in the road; as she comes to learn that a series of drownings have occurred on Beverly Island within the same period, Kelsey suspects that Justin is the culprit, along with Donna agreeing to this, though nobody believes the two girls. When it is verified that Justin is the killer, he attempts to attack Kelsey, but she is saved by Neale; she kisses Neale passionately, and the two teens begin a romantic relationship together although Kelsey is aware that Neale will probably soon be her stepbrother if her mother marries Eric, making them an incestuous couple, though not by blood. Kelsey discovers while in the hospital that Beth and Donna are both alive and safe, but that Justin is responsible for the other murders that have occurred around the island. She wonders what will happen in the future now that the truth has come out.

== Publication ==
The Lifeguard is a standalone thriller novel. This being said, it was published under the imprint Point Horror in the late 1980s, making it #3 in the imprint's series. The original first Point Horror edition with its wavy aquatic title font is sought after by collectors, while subsequent editions have had a variety of more modern cover image designs. John Bilancini of 80s Baby described the original first edition cover fondly, saying of it, "if you grew up in the 1980s with access to Scholastic Book Fairs, you know the cover: A stern looking teenage hunk in sunglasses, sitting on a lifeguard stand. Next to the picture is the caption, “Don’t call for help. He may kill you.”" Alissa Burger of Tor called The Lifeguard one of the most iconic symbols of the 1980s teen horror paperback movement in western pop culture, saying, "the cover of Cusick’s The Lifeguard is one of the most iconic of the Point Horror novels, featuring a muscled, blonde, and unsmiling lifeguard sitting atop a lifeguard station, looking over the water and directly out toward the reader. This eponymous lifeguard is ominous and unfeeling, radiating a clear aura of danger. This unsettling image, coupled with the tagline “Don’t call for help. He may just kill you” underscores the reality that in these teen horror novels, it’s best to trust no one, whether in suburban babysitting or on an island vacation. That’s certainly the best strategy for staying alive." More modern variations of the book had silvery, iridescent imagery and more digitized minimalist styles in an attempt to market the book to a 2010s demographic.

In 2021, Book Riot listed The Lifeguard on its "Summertime Scares" reading list; the edition listed had a digitized, radically revamped cover with turquoise text and a shadow silhouette of a lifeguard on it. Book Riot praised the book as a good summer read, saying, "I mean, just look at that cover. That just screams scary beach read right there. It is also a Point Horror book, which was one of the go-tos for YA horror in the early ’90s. This one is about Kelsey, who gets invited to the famous Beverly Island for a fun-filled summer. Too bad for her that someone appears to have other plans for her... As I mentioned, this is a '90s horror, so expect a fair amount of cheese. Still, if you’re looking for an entertaining way to pass a couple of hours, this will do it."

== Reception ==
Modern day critics of The Lifeguard are highly judgemental of the 1988 novel due to the contrast in modern day themes. Professional review blog The Devil's Elbow criticized the book's multiple red herring subplots and the sexism in the book's dialogue, as well as the peculiar dynamics of the Tanner Family, including suggested incest and the callousness of Kelsey Tanner's mother when discussing her late husband. Publishers Weekly agreed with this, stating, "so many red herrings are thrown into this plot that it seems almost logical when the killer turns out to be the one man both Kelsey and readers have been led to trust. This relentless procession of gruesome events and false alarms will leave most horror fans more dazed than alarmed."
