= Karl von Krabbe =

Imperial Russian general of Baltic German descent

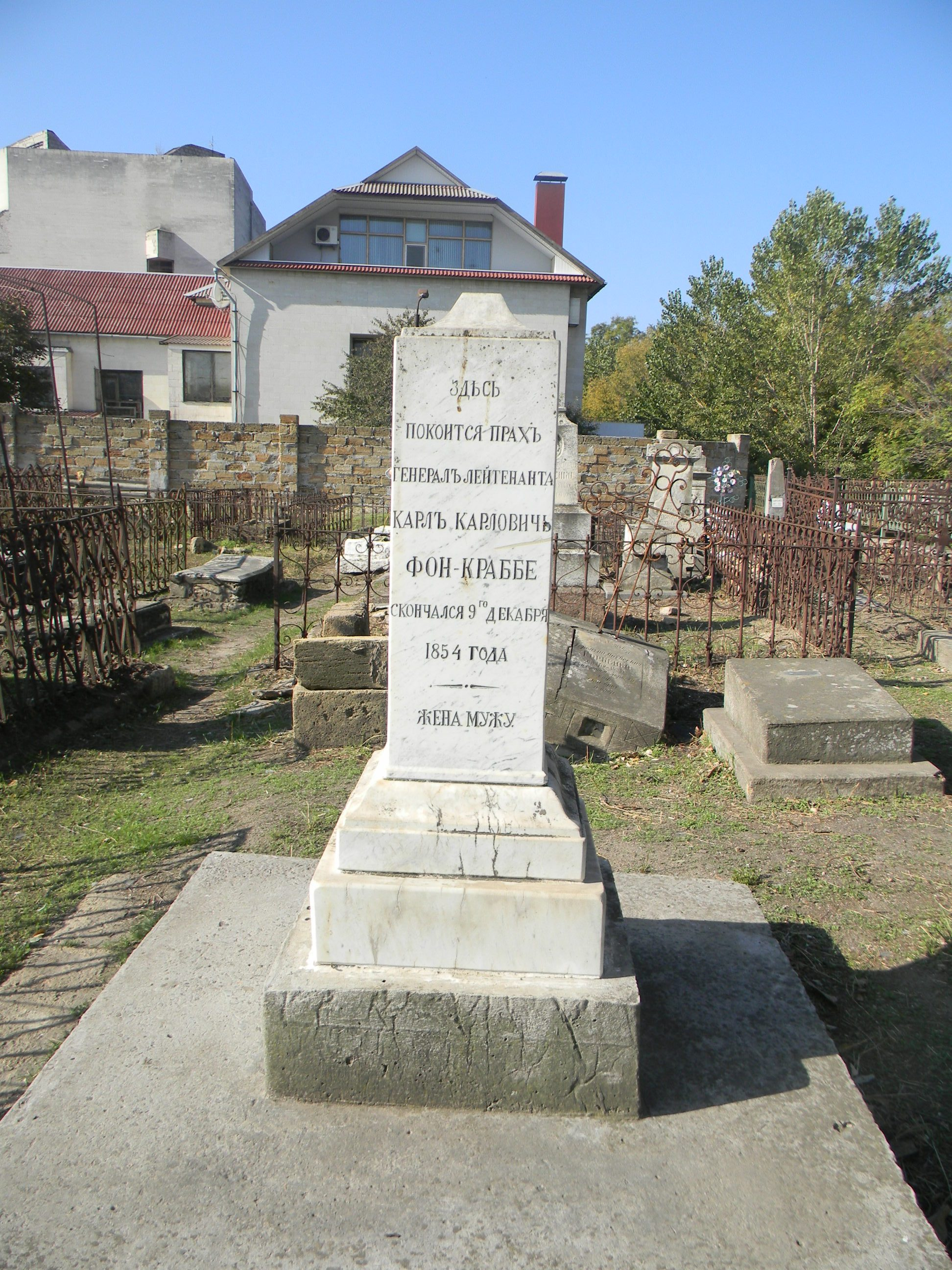
- Gravestone of Krabbe in Kherson
- Native name: Карл Карлович фон Краббе
- Born: 1781; Russian Empire
- Died: December 9, 1854 Kherson, Russian Empire
- Buried: Vsessvyatskoe Cemetery, Kherson
- Allegiance: Russian Empire
- Branch: Infantry
- Service years: 1798–1854
- Rank: Lieutenant-General
- Commands: 12th Jäger Regiment; 46th Jäger Regiment; 3rd Brigade, 20th Infantry Division; 1st Brigade, 21st Infantry Division
- Conflicts: French Revolutionary Wars: Italian and Swiss expedition of 1799; Napoleonic Wars: French Invasion of Russia; Russo-Persian War (1826–1828)
- Awards: Order of Saint George (4th class); Order of Saint Vladimir (3rd & 4th class); Order of Saint Anna (1st, 2nd & 3rd/4th class); Order of the Lion and the Sun (1st class with diamonds); Golden Weapon "For Bravery"
- Spouse: Sofia Fyodorovna Kolachevskaya (1792–1835)
- Children: Nikolai Krabbe

Karl Karlovich von Krabbe (Russian: Карл Карлович фон Краббе; 1781 – 9 December 1854) was a Baltic German officer in the Imperial Russian Army who rose to the rank of Lieutenant General. He served in Alexander Suvorov's celebrated Italian and Swiss campaigns of 1799, held administrative commands across the Caucasus during Russia's imperial expansion there, and ended his career as commandant of Kherson. He was the father of Nikolai Krabbe, who later served as Naval Minister of Russia.

== Biography ==
=== Early service and Suvorov campaigns ===
Karl von Krabbe was born in 1781 in the Russian Empire, of Baltic German descent, originating from Estonia. He began his commissioned military service on 5 July 1798.

He participated in Suvorov's Italian Campaign (April–August 1799), during which a combined Russo-Austrian force drove French troops from northern Italy, and in the Swiss Campaign (10–27 September 1799), the famous crossing of the Alps undertaken as part of the War of the Second Coalition. Notably, in the course of a single year under Suvorov's command, Krabbe was promoted from ensign to captain — a rapid advancement remarkable for the era. For his service in the 1799 campaigns he received the Order of Saint Anna, 3rd class (later renumbered 4th class after the order's restructuring in 1815), on 30 October 1799.

=== Napoleonic era ===
Krabbe received the Order of Saint Vladimir, 4th class with bow, on 18 March 1808, and a Golden Sword "For Bravery" on 4 October 1809. He was promoted to Colonel on 4 May 1811, and on 27 January of that year received the Order of Saint Anna, 2nd class.

From 22 February to 20 May 1811 he commanded the 12th Jäger Regiment. From 14 February 1812 he was appointed chef (nominal head) of the 46th Jäger Regiment, serving in that capacity through the French invasion of Russia until 22 June 1815. From 22 June 1815 he served as its active commanding officer; the regiment was redesignated the 17th Jäger Regiment on 12 February 1816, and he held the command until 29 June 1818. He received the Order of Saint Vladimir, 3rd class, on 31 July 1813.

=== Promotion to General ===
On 29 June 1818, Krabbe was promoted to Major General and appointed commander of the 3rd Brigade of the 20th Infantry Division, a post he held from 1820 to 1821. From 13 April 1823 to 18 June 1830 he commanded the 1st Brigade of the 21st Infantry Division. He received the Order of Saint George, 4th class (№ 3795 in the Grigorovich–Stepanov register), on 12 December 1824, awarded for 25 years of unblemished service.

=== Caucasus service ===
During his career Krabbe held significant administrative commands in the Caucasus. He served as chief administrator of the provinces of Kuba, Baku, and Derbent (attested 1826) — regions recently incorporated following the Russo-Persian War. He defeated Mostafa Khan of Shirvan, who wanted to recover Shirvan Khanate in September 1826. From 1832 he administered the provinces of Karabakh, Sheki, Shirvan, and the Talysh Khanate — territories central to Russian consolidation in the South Caucasus. As of 1840 he was formally attached to the Separate Caucasian Corps.

He received the Order of Saint Anna, 1st class, on 12 February 1828; the Imperial Crown appurtenance to that order followed on 19 April 1835. In 1835 he also received the Persian Order of the Lion and Sun, 1st class with diamonds.

=== Final years ===
Krabbe was promoted to Lieutenant General on 6 December 1835. From 1847 he served as commandant of Kherson, remaining on active military service until the end of his life.

== Death and burial ==
Karl von Krabbe died on 9 December 1854 in Kherson. He was formally struck from the army lists on 11 January 1855. He was buried at the Vsessvyatskoe (All Saints) Cemetery in Kherson.

== Family ==
Krabbe's wife was Sofia Fyodorovna (née Kolachevskaya; 1792–1835), daughter of Fyodor Ivanovich Kolachevsky and Anna Spiridonovna, granddaughter of the Chyhyryn city warden Spiridon Nikolaevich Manvelov, and great-granddaughter of Major General Fyodor Arsenievich Chorba.

They had four known children:

- Nikolai Karlovich Krabbe (1814–1876), statesman and Admiral who served as Naval Minister of Russia (1860–1874).
- Alexandra Karlovna (dates unknown), who married the Decembrist Pavel Mikhailovich Leman (1797–1860).
- Elizaveta Karlovna (dates unknown), who married the Decembrist Semyon Nikolaevich Lashkevich.
- Sofia Karlovna (?–1843), who married the military engineer, baron Peter von Uslar.

== Awards ==
Award	Date
Order of Saint Anna, 3rd class (renumbered 4th class in 1815)	30 October 1799
Order of Saint Vladimir, 4th class with bow	18 March 1808
Golden Sword "For Bravery"	4 October 1809
Order of Saint Anna, 2nd class	27 January 1811
Order of Saint Vladimir, 3rd class	31 July 1813
Order of Saint George, 4th class (№ 3795) — for 25 years of unblemished service	12 December 1824
Order of Saint Anna, 1st class	12 February 1828
Imperial Crown to Order of Saint Anna, 1st class	19 April 1835
Order of the Lion and the Sun, 1st class with diamonds (Persia)	1835

== Sources ==
- Amburger, Erik. "Krabbe, Karl — Erik-Amburger-Datenbank: Ausländer im Russländischen Reich". Leibniz-Institut für Ost- und Südosteuropaforschung (IOS).
- "фон Краббе Карл Карлович (1781–1854)". Necropolural.
- "Херсонский некрополь". Archived from the original on 2014-10-27.
- Podmazio, Alexander. "Командный состав российской регулярной армии (1796–1855)". Archived from the original on 2021-04-19.
- "Краббе фон Карл Карлович". Archived from the original on 2014-08-22.
- "Высочайшие приказы о чинах военных от 11 января 1855 года". Archived from the original on 2023-05-17.
- Список генералам по старшинству. Исправлен по 21-е декабря 1852 года. Saint Petersburg: Военная типография. 1852. p. 87.
- Список генералам по старшинству. Исправлен по 1-е января 1840 года. Saint Petersburg. 1840. p. 132.
- Ismailov, E. E. (2007). Золотое оружие с надписью «За храбрость». Списки кавалеров 1788–1913. Moscow. p. 95.
- "Краббе, Карл Карлович". Большая русская биографическая энциклопедия (3.0 ed.). Moscow: Бизнессофт, ИДДК. 2007.
