= Khanchobany =

17th-century Turkic tribe in Shirvan

Khanchobany (Azerbaijani: Xançobanı, lit. 'Khan's shepherd', Persian: خانچوپانلو, romanized: Khānchopānlū) was a Turkic semi-nomadic tribe formed in the 17th century in Shirvan.

The origins of the tribe’s settlement in Shirvan are unclear. It is likely that this tribe was among the Turkoman clans and tribes that migrated to the region at an unspecified point in time. Zayn al-Abidin Shirvani identifies the Khanchobany as the main tribe of Shirvan with around 3000-house population around Shamakhi. While in greater Shirvan area, number of households reached to 100,000. According to him, all were "Turkic-speaking, brave, and valiant. They are exceptionally well-formed and attractive in appearance. [...] In bravery and manliness, they resemble Rustam and Esfandiyār. In generosity, they are exceptional, and in caring for strangers and the poor, they stand out."

Ruling house of Shirvan Khanate, House of Sarkar (Persian: آلِ سَرکار, romanized: Āl-e Sarkār) was a noble clan from Khanchobany tribe. Tribe also gave his name to a folk dance Khanchobany. Khanchobany tribe were living primarily in Khanchobany mahal of Shirvan Khanate, because of being clan of the ruling house, mahal was not subject to mal-o-jahat (harvest) taxation. However, there were 1,085 taxpaying and 473 tax-exempt families in by 1820.

== Sources ==
- Bakikhanov, Abbasgulu agha; Floor, Willem M.; Ǧawādī, Ḥasan (2009). The heavenly rose-garden: a history of Shirvan & Daghestan. Washington, DC: Mage Publ. ISBN 978-1-933823-27-0.
- Bournoutian, George A. (2021). From the Kur to the Aras: a military history of Russia's move into the South Caucasus and the first Russo-Iranian war, 1801-1813. Iran studies. Leiden: Brill. ISBN 978-90-04-44515-4.
