= Sulut =

- Municipality
- Location within Azerbaijan
- Coordinates: 40°46′01″N 48°27′27″E
- Country: Azerbaijan
- Rayon: Ismailli

Population
  - Total: 886
- Time zone: UTC+4 (AZT)
  - Summer (DST): UTC+5 (AZT)

Sulut is a village and municipality in the Ismailli Rayon of Azerbaijan. It has a population of 886. The municipality consists of the villages of Sulut, Kələzeyvə, and Sərsurə.
