= Cavadxanlı =

Javadkhanly
- Municipality
- Azerbaijani: Cavadxanlı
- Location within Azerbaijan
- Coordinates: 39°53′N 48°08′E
- Country: Azerbaijan
- District: Imishli

Population
  - Total: 1,097
- Time zone: UTC+4 (AZT)
  - Summer (DST): UTC+5 (AZT)

Cavadxanlı (Javadkhanly) is a village and municipality in the Imishli District of Azerbaijan. It has a population of 1,097.
