= Richie Tankersley Cusick =

American author

- Born: April 1, 1952 (age 74); New Orleans, Louisiana, U.S.
- Occupation: Author

Richie Tankersley Cusick (born April 1, 1952, in New Orleans, Louisiana) is an American author. She has written more than 25 novels since her first, Evil on the Bayou (1984). She has also contributed to the Buffy the Vampire Slayer book series with the novelization of the 1992 film, the first two TV episodes, collected under the title of The Harvest, from screenplays by Joss Whedon, and "The Angel Chronicles Vol. 2" based on the teleplays "Halloween" by Carl Ellsworth, "What's My Line, part 1" by Howard Gordon and Marti Noxon and "What's My Line, part 2" by Marti Noxon. Cusick's novel "Walk of the Spirits" was released in April 2008.

== Published works ==
- The Ink & the Paper (1984)
- Evil on the Bayou (August 1984)
- The Lifeguard (1988)
- Trick or Treat (October 1989)
- April Fools (April 1990)
- Scarecrow (June 1990)
- Teacher's Pet (December 1990)
- Vampire (June 1991)
- Buffy The Vampire Slayer (1992)
- Fatal Secrets (January 1992)
- The Mall (October 1992)
- Blood Roots (December 1992)
- Silent Stalker (April 1993)
- Help Wanted (October 1993)
- The Locker (April 1994)
- The Drifter (July 1994)
- Someone at the Door (October 1994)
- Overdue (April 1995)
- Summer of Secrets (July 1996)
- Starstruck (November 1996)
- The Harvest (September 1997)
- The Angel Chronicles, Vol. 2 (January 1999)
- Am i next? (1999)
- The House Next Door (January 2002)
- The Unseen: It Begins (2003)
- The Unseen: Rest in Peace (2004)
- The Unseen: Blood Brothers (2005)
- The Unseen: Sin and Salvation (2005)
- Walk of the Spirits (April 2008)
- Shadow Mirror (March 2010)
