= Amanullah Khan Afshar =

Khan of Zanjan from 1797 to 1810

Amanallah Khan Khamseh-Afshar (Persian: امان الله خان خمسه افشار) was one of the most prominent commanders in the army of the Qajar shah (king) of Iran, Fath-Ali Shah Qajar (r. 1797–1834).

A member of the Afshar clan of Zanjan (which he briefly governed), he was a son of Farajallah Khan Afshar. In 1806, during the Russo-Persian War of 1804–1813, Amanallah Khan was amongst the commanders assigned with the task to aid Ibrahim Khalil Khan, the khan (governor) of the Karabakh Khanate. However, by the time he had arrived, Ibrahim Khalil Khan had been murdered by the Russians.

== Sources ==
- Behrooz, Maziar (2023). Iran at War: Interactions with the Modern World and the Struggle with Imperial Russia. I.B. Tauris. ISBN 978-0755637379.
- Bournoutian, George (2021). From the Kur to the Aras: A Military History of Russia's Move into the South Caucasus and the First Russo-Iranian War, 1801–1813. Brill. ISBN 978-9004445154.
