= Şükürlü, Jalilabad =

Village and municipality in Azerbaijan

Coordinates: 39°20′N 48°20′E

Şükürlü is a village and municipality in the Jalilabad Rayon of Azerbaijan. It has a population of 385.
