= Melik Rahim Bey =

Azerbaijani statesman and grandfather of Hasan bey Zardabi

Naib of Qarasubasar mahal
- In office ?–c. 1830
- Appointed by: Mostafa Khan of Shirvan
- Preceded by: Melik Fath ʻAli Beg
- Succeeded by: Salim Bey Melikov

Personal details
- Died: c. 1830

Melik Rahim Bey (Azerbaijani: Məlik Rəhim bəy; Russian: Рагимъ-бекъ Зардобскій, died c. 1830) was an Azerbaijani noble and hereditary melik of the village of Zardab in the Shirvan Khanate, later Shirvan province of the Russian Empire.

He served as naib of the Qarasubasar mahal under the Russian administration that succeeded the deposition of Mustafa Khan in 1820, and was involved in the Russo-Persian War (1826–1828) as a Russian-aligned local commander on the Kura frontier of Shirvan. He was the paternal grandfather of the Azerbaijani educator and journalist Hasan bey Zardabi.

== Background ==
His father was Melik Fath ʻAli Beg. He had three brothers named Jafarqulu Bey, Mammadali Bey, and Qadir Bey. As melik of Zardab before 1820, Rahim Bey held his title within the administrative structure of the khanate under Mustafa Khan of Shirvan, who ruled Shirvan as a Russian vassal from 1805 until his flight to Persia in August 1820. After Mustafa Khan's deposition the khanate was abolished and reorganised as a Russian province; Rahim Bey retained his hereditary status and was confirmed as naib of the Karasubasar mahal under the new Russian civil administration. His cousins Khalil Bey and Rostam Bey also had estates in the city.

Zardab in this period was a settlement of around 230 households with reed houses for the population and only two fired-brick structures: the village mosque, and the bey's otag — a court-residence in the village square in which the bey conducted judicial proceedings, lodged visiting guests, and exercised the routine police-judicial authority that constituted bey rule in practice. According to the family-memoir biography of Hasan bey Zardabi written by his wife Hanifa Malikova, Rahim Bey and his son Salim Bey were both patrons of literature of their period, and the poets of the time were regularly received as guests in their guest house at Zardab.

== Tenure ==
In the summer of 1826 Abbas Mirza of Persia invaded the Russian-held Caucasian provinces, dispatching the deposed Mostafa Khan of Shirvan to reclaim Shirvan with Persian regular and irregular forces. The province defected to Mustafa Khan on 23 July 1826, and by August his forces had occupied Old Shamakhi and the lowland mahals. Rahim Bey was among the named Azerbaijani officials who remained loyal to Russia throughout the occupation.

In late September 1826, with Mustafa Khan's forces blockading the Russian garrison at Kuba, Rahim Bey conducted intelligence operations from Zardab and prepared the Kura for a Russian counter-offensive. According to the Soviet historian Hajji Murat Ibrahimbeyli, working from the same archival record, Rahim Bey hid six large boats in forest cover near Zardab and undertook to convey Russian troops safely across the river — an offer reported by Prince Madatov to the commander-in-chief on 30 September 1826. Around the same time, Rahim Bey dispatched a scout — the unnamed son of a Zardab resident named Maharram — to destroy the ferries on the Kura at Zardab. The operation succeeded; the scout was killed in action; and the Persian-aligned forces were forced to relocate their crossing operations downstream to Salyan, with significant operational delay.

The destruction of the Zardab ferries triggered a direct Persian response. On 30 September 1826, on the basis of intelligence from Rahim Bey, the Russian command learned that Mustafa Khan had detached his son Aliqoli Agha with 400 cavalry to maintain a guard along the Kura, specifically because of Rahim Bey's known loyalty to Russia. The deployment of a major detachment in response to a single naib's activities is an indication of the operational weight Russian and Persian commanders both attached to the Zardab position.

In October 1826, after Mustafa Khan's flight from Shirvan, Russian forces under Colonel Mishchenko occupied Shamakhi and faced an acute supply crisis. Treasury grain at Agsu had been destroyed during the Persian occupation, but stores at the village of Ləki — over 56,000 puds of wheat and 2,800 puds of barley — were found intact. Madatov's correspondence reveals that Rahim Bey had received a directive from him "immediately after the defeat of Abbas Mirza, during the time of the fugitive Mustafa's presence in Shirvan" to preserve the Lyaki stores by every available means, and had reported that he would endeavour to do so. This was performed under close watch by the nukers of the sons of the deposed Selim Khan of Sheki, who were operating in the area at the time. The preservation of the Laki grain proved decisive for the supply of Paskevich's corps in Karabakh in late 1826 and early 1827, and Madatov subsequently arranged the transfer of 1,000 chetverts of grain from Shirvan to the Agoghlan magazine on Rahim Bey's organisation.

Following Mustafa Khan's defeat at the Battle of Javad on 14 October 1826 and his flight across the Aras, Rahim Bey and Nowruz ʿAli Beg of Alvent commanded a sector of the Russian-organised picket line along the right bank of the Kura, from the village of Tyurpin-Sita to Tilanköyün, manned by levies raised from Zardab and Alvent. The cordon served two simultaneous functions: containing the cross-river raids that Mustafa Khan continued to mount from the Persian side, and sealing the Kura against any escape southward by the sons of the deposed Salim Khan of Shaki and the Georgian prince Alexander, who were operating in Sheki province at the time. Rahim Bey's son Salim Bey was active in the same operations; in October 1826 he was present at Laki to assist in the survey and onward transport of the treasury grain.

In summer or autumn 1829, Khosrow Mirza, son of Crown Prince Abbas Mirza of Persia, returned to Persia from Saint Petersburg following the Persian apology embassy to Tsar Nicholas I for the murder of Alexander Griboyedov at the Russian embassy in Tehran on 30 January 1829. (Note: Khosrow Mirza was received in St. Petersburg in August 1829 and returned to Persia via the Caucasus that autumn.) Among the Shirvan beys dispatched to greet the prince in Karabakh was Rahim Bey. According to family tradition recorded by Hasan bey Zardabi's wife Hanifa Malikova, Rahim Bey looked at the velvet-clad and jewel-bedecked young prince and remarked to a bey standing next to him:

I would dress this prince in a short, comfortable coat, mount him on an unsaddled horse, and send him off to learn the country he is going to rule. The result would be a real ruler. As he is dressed and ornamented now, he is dressed like a woman, and a woman is what he will turn out to be.

Khosrow Mirza overheard and demanded to be told what had been said. Rahim Bey "did not lose his composure and told him the whole truth"; the prince was reported to have been pleased with the answer. This encounter is the latest documented activity of Rahim Bey.

== Death and succession ==
Rahim Bey died sometime between his last documented activity in 1829 and 3 April [N.S. 15 April] 1830, when his son Salim Bey is recorded in the official imperial register as a recipient of the Order of St. Anne, 4th class under the title naib. His descendants adopted Melikov surname.

== Family ==
Rahim Bey's wife was a member of the Aghayev family of Shusha in the Karabakh Khanate, establishing a marriage link to the Karabakh bey nobility. Her brother was Faraj bey Aghayev. Rahim bey was grandfather of Hasan bey Zardabi through his eldest son Salim bey, who succeeded him as naib of Qarasubasar Mahal until 1853. Garibsoltan Malikova and Peri Topchubashova were his great-grandchildren through Hasan bey. Rahim bey's granddaughter Imarat Malikova was married to Najafgulu bey Sheyda, a union which resulted in birth of Muhammad Hassan Bey Veliyev-Baharly. Rahim bey's daughter Tubu khanum was married to Samad bey Adigozalov from Karabakh, from whom folk singer Zulfu Adigozalov, Vasif Adigozalov, Rauf Adigozalov, and Yalchin Adigozalov descends.

== Sources ==
- Həsənov, Eldəniz Əli oğlu (2013). Həsən bəy Zərdabi irsi: keşməkeşli həyat yolu [Hasan bey Zardabi's legacy: a tumultuous life path] (in Azerbaijani). Baku: Zardabi.
- Ibragimbeyli, Khadji Murat (1969). Россия и Азербайджан в первой трети XIX века (из военно-политической истории) [Russia and Azerbaijan in the first third of the XIX century (from military-political history)] (in Russian). Moscow: Nauka.
- Malikova, Hanifa (1985). "Биография Гасан бека Меликова-Зардаби" [Biography of Hasan bey Melikov-Zardabi]. In Goyushov, Ziyaddin (ed.). Современники о Г. Зардаби [Contemporarys on Hasan bey Zardabi] (in Russian). Baku: Elm. p. 26.
- Zardabi, Hasan bey (1884-01-22). "Пережитое" [Experienced]. Каспій [The Caspian] (in Russian) (18). Baku.
- Список Кавалерам Императорских Российских орденов всѣхъ наименованій за 1830 [List of Knights of the Imperial Russian Orders of All Names for 1830] (in Russian). Vol. 3. St. Petersburg: Imperial Academy of Sciences. 1830.
- Potto, Vasily (1906). "Материалы к истории Персидской войны 1826–1828 г.г." [Materials for the history of the Persian War of 1826–1828]. Кавказский сборник (in Russian). 25. Tiflis.
- Potto, Vasily (1907). "Материалы к истории Персидской войны 1826–1828 г.г." [Materials for the history of the Persian War of 1826–1828]. Кавказский сборник (in Russian). 26. Tiflis.
