= Garibsoltan Malikova =

- Qəribsoltan Məlikova
- Born: Qəribsoltan Həsən bəy qızı Məlikova; 11 June 1886; Zardab, Geokchay uezd, Baku Governorate, Russian Empire
- Died: 9 March 1967 (aged 80); Baku, Azerbaijan SSR, Soviet Union
- Occupations: Educator, teacher
- Parent(s): Hasan bey Zardabi; Hanifa Malikova
- Relatives: Alimardan bey Topchubashov (brother-in-law)

Garibsoltan Hasan bey gizi Malikova (Azerbaijani: Qəribsoltan Həsən bəy qızı Məlikova; 11 June 1886 – 9 March 1967) was an Azerbaijani educator and teacher. She was the daughter of journalist and educator Hasan bey Zardabi and educator Hanifa Malikova.

== Early life and education ==
Garibsoltan Malikova was born on 11 June 1886 in Zardab, Geokchay uezd, Baku Governorate, then part of the Russian Empire. She graduated from a Russian girls' gymnasium in Tiflis and later studied at a model girls' school directed by her mother from 1901 to 1905.

In 1914, she passed examinations before the Pedagogical Council of the First Baku Men's Gymnasium named after Emperor Alexander III and received the title of teacher of public schools.

== Teaching career ==
Garibsoltan Malikova began teaching in 1910. From 1915 to 1918, she taught at the Russo-Tatar girls' school in Baku, and from 1918 to 1920 at the Russo-Tatar girls' gymnasium.

Archival documents preserved in the Azerbaijan State Historical Archive state that Malikova worked as a teacher of Turkish, meaning Azerbaijani, at the Third Baku Women's Gymnasium. In 1948, she was transferred to the Second Baku Women's Gymnasium as a Turkish-language teacher.

The transfer followed a request from the chair of the Pedagogical Council of the Second Baku Women's Gymnasium, who stated that Malikova had been invited to teach Turkish in four classes for eight hours per week.

Because of political pressure on her family, including accusations directed at her father and the newspaper Akinchi, Malikova later moved to Ganja. She also worked for a period as a teacher in Shamkir.

According to some accounts, during the Second World War, Malikova moved to Zardab with Nana khanim, the mother of composer Rauf Hajiyev, and both worked as teachers at the Zardab school. Malikova did not marry. She helped raise and educate Rauf Hajiyev and his sister Adila, and later taught for many years at a boarding school in Baku for orphaned children.

A 1938 attestation document preserved in the Salman Mumtaz State Archive of Literature and Art states that Malikova received the title of primary school teacher. At that time, she was working at the Third Russian-Muslim girls' school in Baku.

In 1948, Malikova was awarded the honorary title of Merited Teacher and received the Order of Lenin for her work in education. She continued teaching until 1956.

== Memories of Hasan bey Zardabi ==
Malikova wrote memoirs about her father under the title Atam haqqında xatirələrim (lit. 'My Memories of My Father'). One episode describes a visit to the family home by Maxim Gorky and Feodor Chaliapin, connected with Zardabi's work at the newspaper Kaspi.

In 1937, when the new Baku–Salyan highway was planned through the cemetery near the Bibi-Heybat Mosque, Malikova arranged for Zardabi's remains to be removed from his grave. According to Xalq qəzeti, the remains were later reburied near the grave of his wife Hanifa Malikova. In 1957, during preparations to commemorate the 50th anniversary of Zardabi's death, their remains were transferred to the Alley of Honor in Baku.

== Later life and death ==
Garibsoltan Malikova died in Baku on 9 March 1967.
