= History of Azerbaijani press =

The story of the press in Azerbaijan began with Akinchi, the first Azerbaijani-language newspaper, published by Hasan bey Zardabi in Baku between 1875 and 1877. Other newspapers followed through the remainder of the 19th century. This was a time of re-emergence for Azerbaijani literature in general.

== Appearance of printing ==
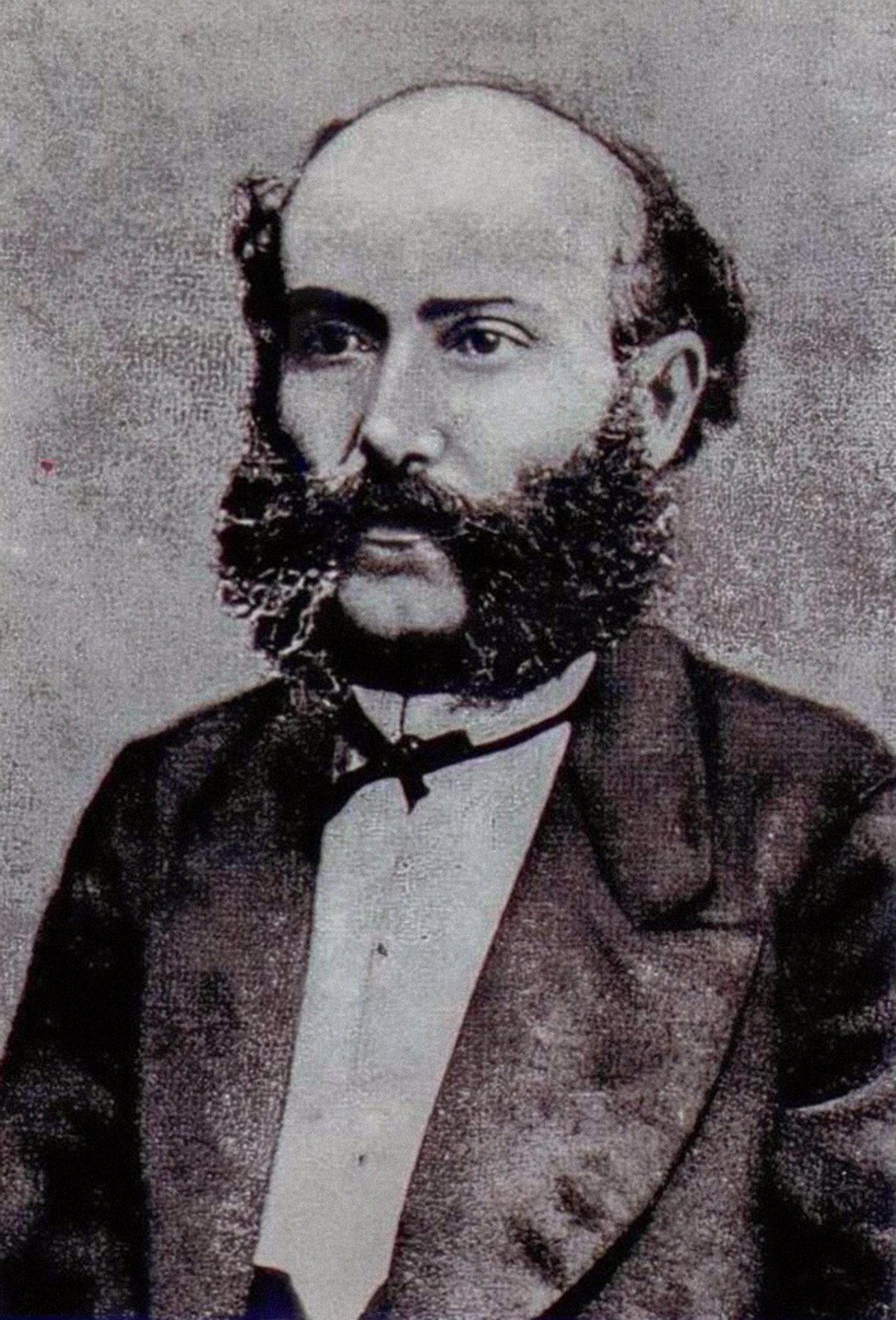
Hasan bey Zardabi

The whole generation of public figures, talented Azerbaijani publicists and leading thinkers of their time were trained and formed in press. Hasan bey Zardabi was founder of publishing in Azerbaijan. He sought agreement for publication of “Akinchi” newspaper in native language in the period of Tsar’s colonial system, after a prolonged struggle. Publishing of this newspaper drew a wide response in the Caucasus. At first editorial staff of the newspaper consisted of only one person. Zardabi was simultaneously the publisher, editor, corrector and typesetter of the newspaper. In 1875-1877, 56 issues of the newspaper were published. For the purpose of arousing interest of wide masses he ought to spread it gratuitously.

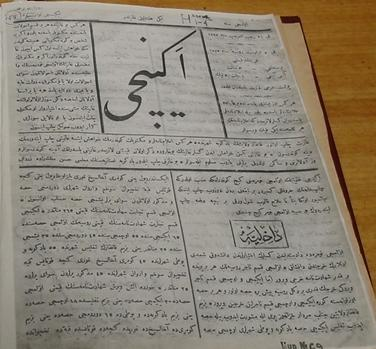
“Akinchi” newspaper

Publishing the newspaper Hasan bey first of all attempted to achieve the main goal – propagation of ideas of the nation’s enlightenment. Publishing articles about country life, agriculture irrigation works he wanted to help peasants to overcome illiteracy in agricultural sphere. Creation of national unity was the main principle. Situation of the newspaper sharply complicated with the beginning of the Russo-Turkish War (1877–1878). Tsar’s censorship prohibited to touch upon political issues in the newspaper. In 1877, the decree about liquidation of the newspaper was issued.

== “Ziya”, “Ziyayi-Qafqaziyye”, “Keshkul” ==
In January, 1879 “Ziya” newspaper began to be published in Turkish language, in Tbilisi. Since 1880, this newspaper was published under “Ziyayi-Qafqaziyye” name. After publication of 104 issues, the newspaper was closed in 1884. In 1880, “Keshkul” newspaper was published in Tbilisi. Jalal Unsizade, publisher of the newspaper was well acquainted with European culture. Ideas of “Keshkul” were similar to ideas of “Akinchi”. Journalistic articles, materials on the issues of language, literature, enlightenment, recommendations on socio-political issues, passages from original works and translations of patterns of the Eastern and European literature were published in the newspaper. Seyid Azim Shirvani, Firidun bey Kocharli and Mammad agha Shahtakhtinski also cooperated with the newspaper.

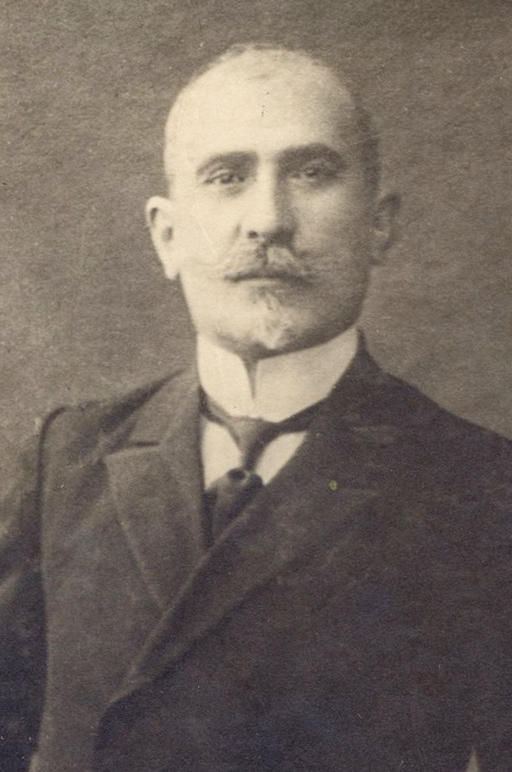
Firidun bey Kocharli

== Printed publications ==
In 1880-1890s, newspapers such as “Kaspiy”, “Baku” and “Bakinskie izvestiya” were published in native language, in Baku. The first typographies and lithographies were established in Baku, Shamakhi, Ganja and other cities because of a growth in the amount of newspapers published in native language. If there were 5 typographies and 1 lithography in Baku, in 1889, then in 1990 the number of typographies reached to 16.

== Literature ==
Democratic ideas the foundations of which in Azerbaijani literature were set by Mirza Fatali Akhundov were developed in creativity of Seyid Azim Shirvani, Jalil Mammadguluzadeh (1866-1932) and Najaf bey Vazirov (1854-1926).

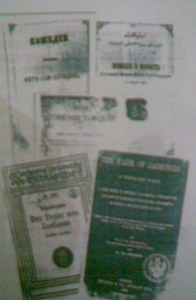
Translations of works by M.F.Akhundov in European languages

Abdurrahim bey Hagverdiyev and Khurshidbanu Natavan also had great services in development of Azerbaijani literature. They applied many efforts for making Azerbaijani language the national heritage.

Akhundov, who began his writing with poems, then created a series of comedies including Narrative about Ibrahim Khalil the Alchemist, Adventures of the Miser ("Haji Gara") and The Vizier of Lankaran Khanate. He laid the foundation of the drama genre in Azerbaijani literature and achieved wide fame in the Near East. The development of artistic prose in the second half of the 19th century is also connected with his name. In 1857, after writing the comedies, he wrote The Deceived Stars.

Najaf bey Vazirov also was one of the eminent enlighteners. 1890s is the most productive period in his creativity. During this period he wrote such works as “A stone thrown behind, will hit in the heel”, “Late contrition doesn’t yield fruits”, “Only name has remained” and “Fakraddin’s grief”. There was no theatre in the Caucasus where Vazirov's works were not staged on.

Khurshidbanu Natavan, the daughter of the last Khan of Karabakh Khanate Mekhdigulu Khan was famed in Karabakh with “Khan gizi” (“Khan’s daughter”) pseudonym. Beginning of her creativity is dated from the 1850s and she mainly wrote in “ghazal” genre.
