= Peri Topchubashova =

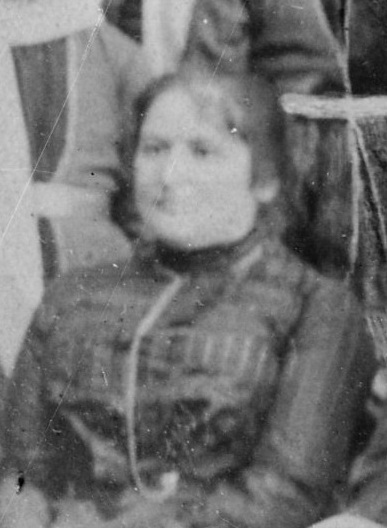
- Peri Topchubashova in 1901
- Born: 1873; Russian Empire
- Died: 1947 (aged 73–74); Paris, France
- Spouse: Alimardan bey Topchubashov
- Parents: Hasan bey Zardabi (father); Hanifa Malikova (mother)

Peri khanum Topchubashova (1873 – 1947) was the First Lady of Azerbaijan, wife of Alimardan bey Topchubashov.

== Biography ==
Peri khanum Topchubashova (née Malikova) was born in 1873 in the Zardab, into the family of Hasan bey Zardabi and Hanifa Malikova. The prominent Azerbaijani publicist Hasan bey Zardabi was the editor of the first Azerbaijani-language newspaper "Akinchi" and his wife, Hanifa Malikova, was one of the first women in the Caucasus who received secular education. Peri was the eldest of their four children.

After being unemployed in Baku for two years, Hasan bey Zardabi moved with his family to his native village of Zardab in 1880. At that time, his eldest daughter, Peri, was 7 years old. Although the family's financial situation was difficult, Hasan bey was determined to educate his daughter. Since there were no girls' schools in Azerbaijan, Hasan bey took his daughter to Tiflis and enrolled her in the Russian girls' gymnasium where Peri's mother, Hanifa Malikova had previously studied. Maintaining regular contact with the Tiflis press and intellectuals, Hasan bey often visited the gymnasium and took an interest in his daughter's studies. In a short time, Peri khanum earned the respect of her teachers with both her education and high manners. Thus, Peri khanum became the first Azerbaijani girl to receive an education at the Russian girls' gymnasium in Tiflis.

In 1889, Topchubashova went to Saint Petersburg and began her studies at the Faculty of Law at Saint Petersburg University, where she graduated with excellent marks. After that, she worked in various positions such as a judicial assistant, a clerk at the district court, and a lawyer in Tiflis and Baku.

Researcher Garanfil Dunyamin gizi writes that while Peri khanum was still studying at the Russian girls' gymnasium in Tiflis, she caught Alimardan bey Topchubashov's attention not only with her interest in education and innovation but also with her beauty, purity, and simplicity, traits typical of Eastern women. A sincere friendship developed between them, which later turned into a noble love and a faithful lifelong partnership. On December 31, 1893, in Tiflis, Peri khanum married Alimardan bey Topchubashov. Despite her father being a very progressive intellectual, he asked for a dowry of 10,000 rubles from Topchubashov for his daughter. However, since Topchubashov did not have that much money, he and Peri decided not to hold a wedding ceremony and to give the saved money to Hasan bey instead.

Pari Topchubashova had five children. Four of them: her sons Alakbar bey and Enver bey Topchubashov, and her daughters Sara khanum Sultanoğlu and Sevar khanum Topchubashova attended the funeral of their father, Alimardan bey Topchubashov, along with their mother. Topchubashova lived in exile in France and passed away there in 1947. She was buried near Paris in the Saint-Cloud cemetery, beside her husband Alimardan bey Topchubashov.
