= Azerbaijani Teacher (newspaper) =

Azerbaijani newspaper

Azerbaijani Teacher (Azerbaijani: Azərbaycan müəllimi) is an organ of the Ministry of Education of the Republic of Azerbaijan.

== History ==
In the mid-30s of the twentieth century, due to the growth of the population and the development of the press in the Azerbaijan SSR, the demand for the establishment of the pedagogical press increased. Thus, in order to promote the development of public education, on September 2, 1934, the publication of the newspaper named "Communist Enlightenment" started.

Due to the fact that the newspaper paid more attention to pedagogical issues, in 1938 it was renamed “Teacher's Newspaper". The newspaper was published under this name until June 1941. During the Great Patriotic War (from June 1941 to April 1946), its publication was suspended. Since April 1946, the newspaper has been published under the name "Azerbaijani Teacher".

In 1992, the publication of the newspaper was temporarily suspended until the end of the 90-s.

In the newspaper “Azerbaijani teacher,” the works of such scientists and academics as Mehdi Mehdizadeh, Ahmed Seyidzadeh, Mardan Muradkhanov, Shovgi Agayev, Nuraddin Kazimov, Zahid Garalov, Bashir Akhmedov, Misir Mardanov, Aliheydar Gashimov, Yahya Kerimov, Aziz Efendizadeh, Huseyn Ahmadov, Akbar Bayramov, Abdul Alizadeh, Ajdar Agayev, as well as the national teacher Zahid Solovov, Israfil Shukurov and others were published.

== Editors-in-Chief ==
In different years, the newspaper was headed by Rustam Huseynov, Agali Badalov, Mirabbas Aslanov, Shahin Safarov, Mohammad Baharli and the current editor-in-chief Bayram Huseynzade.

== See also ==
- Ministry of education (Azerbaijan)
- History of Azerbaijani press
