= Najafgulu bey Sheyda =

Azerbaijani poet

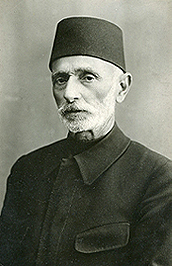
- Native name: Nəcəfqulu bəy Şeyda
- Born: Nəcəfqulu bəy Mirzə Məhəmmədhəsən bəy oğlu Baharlı; 1858 Shusha, Russian Empire
- Died: 1936 (aged 77–78)
- Occupation: Poet, translator, anthologist, theatre actor
- Language: Azerbaijani
- Relatives: Abulfat Vali (brother)

Najafgulu bey Sheyda (Azerbaijani: Nəcəfqulu bəy Şeyda; born 1858), also known as Najafgulu bey Vali, was an Azerbaijani poet, translator, anthologist and theatre enthusiast. He was associated with the literary circles Majlisi-uns and Majlisi-faramushan, and is known as the author of the anthology Gulshani-maarif.

== Biography ==
Najafgulu bey Sheyda was born in 1858 in Shusha. His full name was Najafgulu bey Mirza Mahammadhasan bey oghlu Baharli. According to Mir Mohsun Navvab's Tazkireyi-Navvab, he was from the Baharli family of Garabagh and was a descendant of Molla Vali Vidadi.

Sheyda received his early education at a religious school in Shusha. He later moved to Baku, where he studied at evening courses opened by Zeynalabdin Taghiyev. He worked for about 25 years as a translator in the provincial administration. He also owned oil wells in Balakhani.

Sheyda was an active member of the literary gatherings Majlisi-uns and Majlisi-faramushan. He was also interested in theatre and appeared as an amateur actor in several performances staged in Baku. According to the 1923 book Azərbaycan türk teatrının müxtəsər tarixçəsi (lit. 'A Brief History of Azerbaijani Turkish Theatre'), after 1887 Azerbaijani theatre in Baku developed through the activity of young enthusiasts such as Sultan Majid Ganizade, Habib bey Mahmudbeyov and Najafgulu bey Valiyev, who gathered amateur actors and staged performances.

His brother Abulfat Vali was a well-known Azerbaijani actor, director and theatre organizer.

== Literary activity ==
Sheyda wrote poetry under the pen name Sheyda. Mir Mohsun Navvab included information about him and one of his poems in Tazkireyi-Navvab among the poets of Garabagh.

A manuscript notebook of Sheyda's poems is preserved at the Institute of Manuscripts of Azerbaijan. According to philologist Pasha Karimov, the notebook contains 114 ghazals, 2 musaddases, 3 qit'as, 6 mukhammases, 2 mustazads, 86 rubais and other poems, as well as verse narratives, translations from Middle Eastern poets such as Rumi, Saadi, Hafez and Vahshi, and several Persian-language ghazals. The dated poems range from 1886 to 1936.

Some of Sheyda's later poems criticized the Soviet political order. According to Pasha Karimov, Sheyda's poems included direct criticism of restrictions on speech and the persecution of those who spoke openly. His poem Mətbuat bülbülünə (lit. 'To the Nightingale of the Press'), written in 1924, has been cited as an example of his criticism of censorship and pressure on free expression.

In a poem written in 1936, Sheyda referred to the ruling Bolshevik party as firqeyi-əhli-zəlalət (lit. 'the party of misguidance'), and criticized Soviet pressure on Islam.

== Gulshani-maarif ==
Sheyda was the author of the tazkira Gülşəni-maarif (lit. 'Garden of Enlightenment'). The manuscript of the work was later obtained from his descendants by the Institute of Manuscripts of Azerbaijan. According to Pasha Karimov, the anthology contains information about 24 Azerbaijani poets who lived in Garabagh, Baku and Shamakhi in the 19th and early 20th centuries, together with samples of their works.

Before the manuscript of Gulshani-maarif was acquired, a collection of Sheyda's poems had already been preserved at the Institute of Manuscripts and published in the modern Azerbaijani alphabet with an introduction by Karimov.

== Family ==
Sheyda had a son named Mahammadhasan bey and a daughter named Saltanat khanum. His brother Abulfat Vali was active in Azerbaijani theatre from the late 19th century until 1918. Abulfat Vali performed in amateur theatre productions, worked with the Muslim Actors' Society and the Nijat and Safa theatre troupes, and staged works by Mirza Fatali Akhundov, Nariman Narimanov, Najaf bey Vazirov, Abdurrahim bey Hagverdiyev and Uzeyir Hajibeyov.
