= Najaf bey Vazirov =

19/20th-century Azerbaijani journalist and playwright

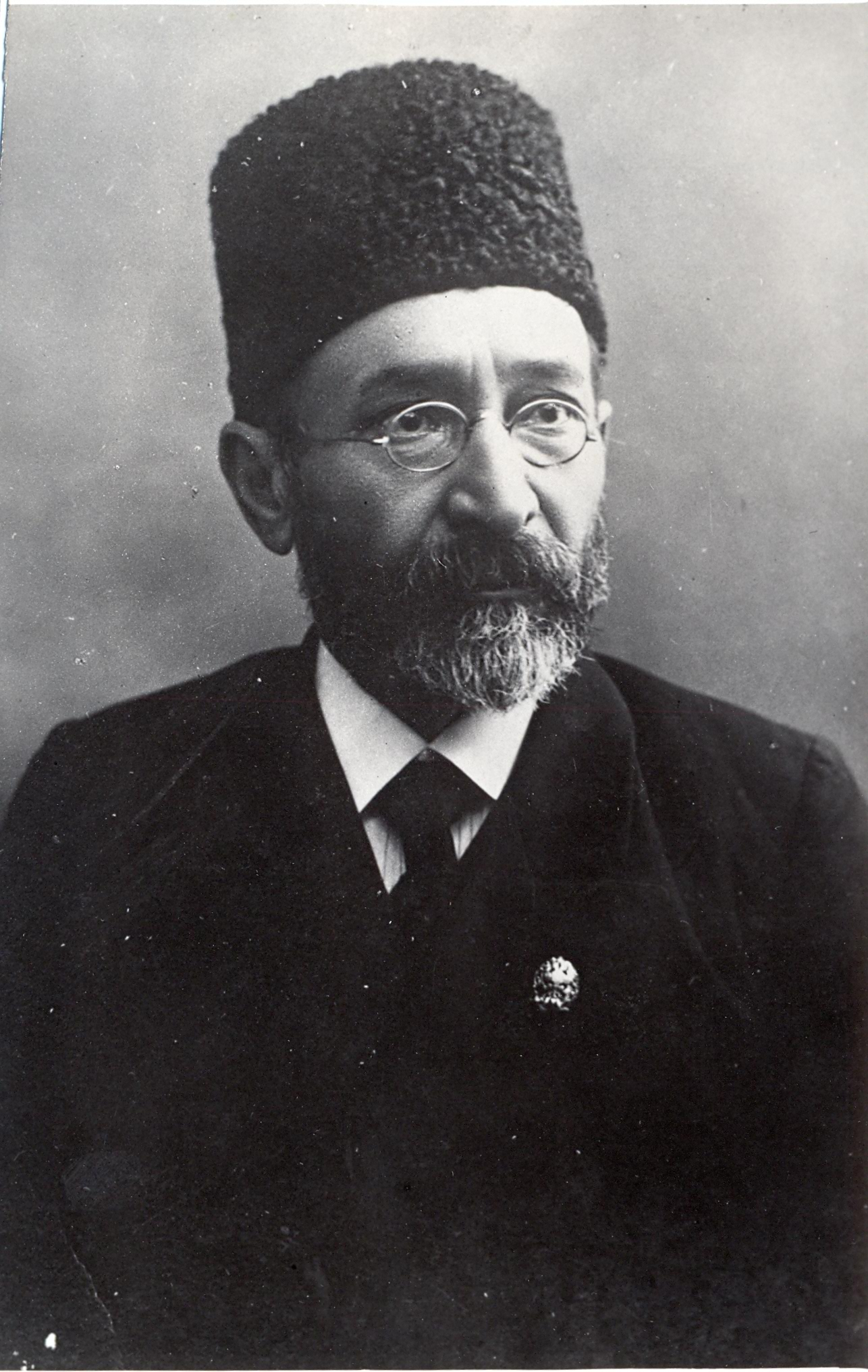
- Born: 17 February 1854; Shusha, Shusha uezd, Shemakha Governorate, Russian Empire (present-day Azerbaijan)
- Died: 9 July 1926 (aged 72); Chukhuryurd, Shemakha uezd, Azerbaijan SSR, Transcaucasian Socialist Federative Soviet Republic, USSR (present-day Azerbaijan)
- Occupations: Forest warden, lawyer, playwright, journalist

Najaf bey Fatali oglu Vazirov (Azerbaijani: Nəcəf-bəy Vəzirov) (17 February 1854 – 9 July 1926) was an Azerbaijani playwright and journalist. Najaf bey Vazirov played an exceptional role in the development of Azerbaijani dramaturgy, enriching its ideological and aesthetic content as well as its artistic qualities, and contributing significantly to the creation and growth of national theater. Through his public activities and literary works, he actively supported the national liberation movement. Najaf bey Vazirov laid the foundation of the tragedy genre in Azerbaijani literature and was closely involved in the expansion of the enlightenment movement directed against the feudal-patriarchal system in Azerbaijan.

As a student in Moscow, he corresponded with his teacher Hasan bey Zardabi and contributed journalistic articles to the newly published Akinchi. He began his dramaturgical career with the comedies "Ev tərbiyəsinin bir şəkli" (A Form of Home Education, 1875) and "Gəmi lövbərsiz olmaz" (A ship cannot sail without an anchor, 1876). The first play addressing the Baku oil industry and the rise of the national bourgeoisie, "Pehlivanani zamane" (1898–1900), was also written by Najaf bey Vazirov.

Following the revolution in Russia in 1917 and the establishment of the Soviet regime, Najaf bey Vazirov was appointed as an inspector in the Forest Department of the Soviet People's Commissariat for Land. He held this position until the end of his life, while simultaneously engaging in theater and translation activities. In his final days, despite warnings from doctors to stop working, he traveled with his students to the village of Chukhuryurd in Shamakhi. On July 9, 1926, he died there of heart failure.

== Life ==
There are varying accounts regarding the birthdate of Najaf Bey Fatali oglu Vazirov. Research indicates dates such as April 2, 1854, and April 11, 1854, with some sources also mentioning February 15 and February 17. Archival documents preserved at the Fuzuli Institute of Manuscripts of the Azerbaijan National Academy of Sciences reveal further discrepancies. These archives list 1859 as his birth year in his passport and membership records, while his identity card issued by the People's Commissariat of the Azerbaijan SSR records it as 1856. During a 40th-anniversary event held in Vazirov’s honor by the “Safa” Society in 1913, the year 1854 was noted. Despite these discrepancies, Vazirov himself stated in his autobiographical work “Tərcümeyi-halım” (1913) that his birth year was 1854.

Najaf Bey was born into the family of Fatali Bey in Shusha, Azerbaijan. He lived in Shusha until the age of 14, where his love for nature took root. His grandfather Najafgulu Bey and his father Fatali Bey were landowners from the village of Zumurkhach in Karabakh. Though initially affluent, the Vazirov family faced increasing financial difficulties, particularly during Fatali Bey's time. He named his firstborn Najaf to honor his father.

Due to his illness, Fatali Bey became incapacitated, and the family's financial burden fell on Najaf Bey's mother, Mina Khanum. She was the daughter of Hasan Bey Mehmandarov, a member of the prominent Mehmandarov family. Despite having wealthy relatives, the Vazirovs received no support from them. In “Tərcümeyi-halım”, Vazirov described these hardships

Najaf Bey began school in 1866 in Shusha. Reflecting on this period in “Tərcümeyi-halım”.Najaf Bey’s late start to schooling was due to his family’s financial struggles. Despite an initially successful year in school, he left the Shusha Municipal School due to the harsh treatment from his teacher. A maternal relative later provided him with basic education, hoping he could support his family in the future by learning Russian. Dissatisfied with this, Vazirov decided in 1868 to leave his mother and move to Baku for better educational opportunities

During Vazirov's arrival in Baku, the city was experiencing rapid industrial and commercial growth due to its burgeoning oil industry. He decided to enroll in the “Realniy Gimnaziya” (Technical Gymnasium). Although he failed to answer history and geography questions during the admission interview, his wit and intelligence earned him a place in the second grade. The curriculum included natural sciences, Russian language and literature, history, geography, mathematics, German, French, and natural philosophy. The school had a profound impact on Vazirov’s intellectual development, providing him access to works by Russian classical authors in their original language. Despite initial struggles in the demanding academic environment, Vazirov managed to pass his classes and excel in later years. In his final year, he achieved outstanding results and graduated with honors in 1874. His education at the Russian school in Baku significantly influenced his future literary endeavors.

Baku's transformation into an industrial city also significantly enriched its cultural life. Russian theaters with rich repertoires operating in the city provided young people with the opportunity to freely express their thoughts, strengthening the desire of educated Muslim youth to create a national theater and write and stage works in their own language. In 1873, while in the sixth grade, Najaf bey became acquainted with the theater and noted in his memoirs that this event had a profound impact on him. The next day, he met with his natural sciences teacher, Hasan bey Melikov (Zardabi), and inquired about the state of theater among Muslims. Inspired by the answers he received, he immediately took action. On March 10, 1873, Vazirov staged Mirza Fatali Akhundov's The Adventures of the Vizier of the Khan of Lankaran and, on April 17, Haji Gara under the guidance of his teacher Zardabi.

For the first time in Azerbaijan, a work by a Muslim writer was staged, and Najaf bey performed a female role in the play Haji Gara. The performance was met with great enthusiasm by the audience and was highly praised by the author of the work, Mirza Fatali Akhundzadeh. Thus, the foundation of the national Azerbaijani theater was laid. Najaf bey wrote about this event:

"...Forty years ago, in 1873, when I was in the sixth grade, I attended a Russian theater for the first time. That night left a deep impression on me. I understood what theater was. The next day, I approached my teacher, Hasan bey Melikov, and asked if there were any plays in our language, such as comedies or tragedies. Hasan bey Melikov found the comedy Haji Gara by the late Mirza Fatali Akhundzadeh. We began preparations to stage this comedy with the Muslim students staying at the dormitory. Every day after lunch, we rehearsed in the dormitory's dining hall. Hasan bey Melikov supervised our preparations, but I directed the rehearsals. The role of Haji Gara was played by the former mayor of Ganja, Asgar bey Adigozalov-Gorani, while I took on a female role. On the day of the performance, there was a large audience, most of whom were Armenians. The governor of Baku, Staroselsky, also attended with his wife. Our performance was very well received by the audience. After the play, the governor's translator, Hasan bey Nabibkov, hosted us for dinner. That night, our teacher Hasan bey Melikov sent a congratulatory telegram to the author of the play, Mirza Fatali Akhundzadeh. Akhundzadeh responded with a two-page letter of appreciation. At the end of the letter, he wrote: 'By staging Haji Gara today, you have added ten years to my life.'"

In June 1874, Najaf bey Vazirov graduated from the gymnasium in Baku and left for Moscow to pursue higher education. By August 1874, he had arrived in St. Petersburg. After passing the entrance exams, he enrolled at a university. However, he fell seriously ill and was forced to return to Moscow. In September 1874, he arrived in Moscow and enrolled in the Forestry Faculty of the Petrovsky-Razumovsky Academy of Forestry and Land Management.

Upon his return to Moscow, only 80 manats remained of the 600 manats he had saved. Vazirov wrote about these years:

"On September 27, 1874, I arrived in Moscow and was admitted to the Petrovsky Academy. At that time, I had only eighty manats left. I paid fifty of this for tuition. My situation was such that only God knew my condition. In Moscow's cold climate, I didn't even have a blanket to cover myself at night. I would pull over the only thing I owned in the world — an old rug. This rug was in such poor condition, like my own plight, that it was only suitable to cover oxen. Because I slept under that rug, I was nicknamed 'Dervish.'"

Soon, Vazirov received a scholarship from the academy, improving his financial situation somewhat. The period when N. B. Vazirov studied in Moscow coincided with the rise of liberation ideas and populist revolutionary movements in Russia. These movements were particularly widespread in cities like Kyiv, Odessa, and Rostov. In Vazirov’s view, the academy fostered a revolutionary and reformist spirit, which undoubtedly influenced his worldview and political ideas, contributing to his intellectual and ideological development. Like other higher education institutions in Moscow and St. Petersburg, the Petrovsky-Razumovsky Academy exhibited certain revolutionary tendencies. Zaman Asgarli wrote that in 1876, a revolutionary stir began at the academy, led by prominent Russian writer V. G. Korolenko and students Grigoriev and Werner, with Najaf bey Vazirov among those signing a petition to the academy's director, F. N. Korolyov. The friendship between V. G. Korolenko and Najaf bey continued in the following years as well. In 1913, during the celebration of Najaf bey’s 40th literary anniversary, Korolenko was among those who sent a congratulatory letter. The letter ended with the words: "Greetings from an old friend and wishes for long-term activity."

During his education in Baku and Moscow, Najaf Bey Vazirov contemplated significant questions regarding the Muslim world's future. He and like-minded peers, under the leadership of Hasan Bey Melikov Zardabi, established the "Imdadiyya" Society.

The society aimed to "act together to end ugliness and evil." Its mission was articulated as follows: "We are advocates of reason; our weapon is science. We must fight against ignorance and backwardness." The "Imdadiyya" Society quickly garnered numerous supporters and attracted the attention of the Moscow authorities. The Moscow administration accused Najaf Bey and his fellow students, A. Gorani, M. Alizadeh, and A. Shahtakhtli, of disseminating prohibited literary and philosophical ideas. Consequently, they were placed under surveillance by the Moscow Gendarmerie Department under the orders of Tsar Alexander II.

Academician Feyzulla Gasimzadeh and Professor M. Mustafayev, who researched Najaf bey’s life and creativity, denied his connection with the revolutionary movement and wrote that he did not participate in political gatherings or organizations. However, Zaman Asgarli writes that certain documents stored in the Moscow October Revolution Archive, especially those related to the "Imdadiyya" society, reveal Najaf bey’s close ties with Russian revolutionary populists and his personal participation in student protests and secret student organizations within the academy. Researcher Kamran Mammadov confirms this fact, stating: "Based on new documents about Zardabi and Vazirov discovered by Doctor of Philosophy Z. Goyushov in the Moscow Central State October Revolution Archive, we can say that Vazirov organized a society called 'Imdadiyya' in Moscow in 1878."

In 1878, Vazirov graduated from the academy, obtaining the profession of forester. Returning to his homeland from Moscow, Vazirov was appointed as a forester in the Tartar district of Yelizavetpol (Ganja) province by the State Property Administration under the Caucasus Governorate on November 15, 1878. According to the government decision of December 26, 1878, positions and salaries for forestry in the Caucasus were determined, and Vazirov was granted the rank of third-class forester. He worked in the Tartar district for over a year and a half. On July 1, 1880, Vazirov’s rank was promoted, and his place of service was changed to Dilijan. Due to his good performance, he was rewarded with 100 manats in 1881. In 1882, he was promoted to first-class forester.

Due to his excellent work and service in his field, the State Senate, with its decision dated January 22, 1887, granted Vazirov the title of "real student" in forestry and promoted his position. He managed the forests of Prince Knyaz Qulu Khan Usmiyev in Yelizavetpol province. While working as a forester, Vazirov engaged in professional development and continued to improve his expertise.

During the 1890s, with the rise of the revolutionary movement in Russia, graduates of the Petrovsky-Razumovsky Academy began to face persecution, arrests, and dismissals. As a "Petrovist," Vazirov was also dismissed from his forestry position. He later wrote about this:

"When the name of the Petrovsky Academy, Russia’s foremost institution of pride, was mentioned, many would be frightened. For that reason, graduates of the Academy were considered frivolous and oppositional."

In 1895, when Vazirov came to Baku, he participated in exams for advocacy to work in courts. After successfully passing the exams, he became a lawyer and began working in courts. In 1903, Najaf bey Vazirov was appointed as the secretary of the Baku City Duma and later as the deputy head of its Vocational School Department. He worked to establish new-style schools in Baku villages. Despite resistance from local clergy, he used various methods to achieve his goal.

His position in the municipality and his advocacy work in the Baku courts provided Najaf bey with a broad opportunity to closely observe and study the life of the Azerbaijani people. These observations and studies became a rich source for his literary activity. While working in the Baku Municipal Assembly, he made significant efforts to ensure that Nariman Narimanov, who had been removed from Baku due to his participation in reformist movements during student years, could return to Baku.

On November 15, 1913, a grand jubilee was held at H. Z. Taghiyev Theatre to mark the 40th anniversary of Vazirov’s literary and artistic activities. On that day, newspapers and journals published articles under the headline "National Holiday." During the jubilee, Azerbaijan’s most prominent intellectuals, including Nariman Narimanov, Jangir Zeynalov, Mahmud bey Mahmudbeyov, Q. Gasimov, A. Rzayev, and Abdulla Shaig, delivered heartfelt speeches addressing the writer. On this occasion, the Safa Enlightenment Society published a special booklet dedicated to Vazirov’s life and creativity. The booklet provided a detailed evaluation of the playwright’s work.

=== Family ===
1. Khurshid Khanum Vazirova - Najaf bey Vazirov's wife, born in 1868.
2. Shamil bey Vazirov - Najaf bey Vazirov's son, born in 1882.
3. Sara Vazirova - Najaf bey Vazirov's daughter, born in 1889.
4. Surayya Vazirova - Najaf bey Vazirov's daughter, born in Shusha.

== Death ==
After the revolution in Russia in 1917, the Soviet regime gradually came to power and appointed Najaf Bey Vazirov as an inspector in the Forest Management of the Soviet People's Commissariat for Land. He continued to work in this position until the end of his life while also pursuing theater and translation projects. In the final days of his life, despite doctors telling him, "You can no longer work," he traveled with his students to the village of Chukhuryurd in Shamakhi. He died from a heart attack on July 9, 1926, in Chukhuryurd.His funeral was attended by a large crowd, and he was buried in Baku. His grave is currently located in the Alley of Honor.

The following newspapers reported on the death of Najaf bey Vazirov: Bakinskiy Raboçi, Maarif və Mədəniyyət, Kendli, and Yeni yol.

== Creativity ==
Although he was engaged in prose and journalism in his works, Najaf bey Vazirov is primarily considered one of the classics of Azerbaijani literature as a playwright. His creativity can mainly be divided into three stages:

- First Stage: 1873–1900
- Second Stage: 1902–1913
- Third Stage: 1913–1921

Najaf bey’s interest in the theater began with the stage performances he attended, but the main influence on his creativity came from the comedies of Mirza Fatali Akhundov, particularly the play "Hacı Gara". He began his creative activity during his years studying at the gymnasium. In the last two years of the gymnasium, Vazirov taught private lessons to foreign students to overcome his family's financial difficulties, noting that he continued his own studies after teaching in the evenings. Although many titles of the numerous plays he wrote during these years are known, a large portion of them has not survived to this day. His works "Əti sənin, sümüyü mənim" and "Qara günlü" ("Black Day") are among the lost plays.

The book titled "Najaf bey Vazirov," published in 1913, reveals that the play "Əti sənin, sümüyü mənim" is based on the theme of education. "Qara günlü" depicts the life story of a widow who has lost her husband.

In September 1874, Vazirov was admitted to the Petrovski-Razumovski Academy in Moscow, where he deepened his interest in theatrical art during his studies, expanding his creative worldview by closely following the works of Russian playwrights. The rich cultural environment of Moscow played a significant role in his personal and creative development. By observing many stage works of Gogol and Ostrovsky, Vazirov learned the subtleties of theatrical art. Especially, Ostrovsky's realistic dramaturgy had a great influence on his creative style.

After watching works like "Günahsız müqəssirlər" ("Innocent Sinners"), "Gəlirli yer" ("The Profitable Place"), "Hər şeyin təzəsi, dostun köhnəsi" ("Everything New, Old Friend"), "İstedadlar" ("Talents"), and "Pərəstişkarlar" ("Admirers") at Moscow’s Maly Theater, Vazirov noted that these works significantly impacted his artistic perspective and thoughts. Zaman Asgerli, who conducted research on Najaf bey’s creativity, emphasizes that the realism and proximity to people's lives found in Ostrovsky's works aligned with Vazirov’s artistic views.

In addition to dramaturgy, Vazirov was also engaged in short story writing. In 1875, he wrote a story titled "Ağıçı" in Moscow and sent it to be published in the newspaper "Akinchi" on August 28 of the same year, where Zərdabi was the editor. However, the feuilleton was not published in "Akinchi." Nevertheless, Najaf bey did not lose heart. Between 1875 and 1876, the young writer sent four more plays to Zərdabi, but he lost those works.

In his articles sent to "Akinchi," Vazirov based his moral and ideological critiques on the economic problems existing in society, particularly the outdated customs, methods, and habits in livestock breeding and agriculture. He emphasized the necessity of persistently and continuously implementing the process of "liberation from the past" and noted the importance of starting this from family upbringing and school education. Setting aside the aforementioned lost works, his play "Ev tərbiyəsinin bir şəkli" ("A Model of Home Education"), completed in 1875, is considered the first work that has survived to this day. In this work, Vazirov illustrated the errors and deficiencies in family, morality, and education issues through the character of landowner Bayrameli bey.Najaf bey Vazirov chose the pen name "Dərviş" for his first published writing. The first poetic headline he used in "Akinchi" was also "Naleyi-Dərviş".

The development of enlightenment dramaturgy begins, first and foremost, with the works of N. Vazirov. Works such as "Daldan atılan daş topuğa dəyər" ("A Stone Thrown from Afar Hits the Heel," 1890), "Sonrakı peşmançılıq fayda verməz" ("Subsequent Regrets Are Useless," 1890), and "Adı var, özü yox" ("A Name Exists, But Not the Person," 1891) are all dedicated to analyzing the various aspects of "Muslim ignorance" that manifest in life and daily activities. Between 1892 and 1894, the writer produced several literary works, of which only the titles of the theatrical pieces "Güzəşt" ("Concession") and "Dad yarımçıq əlindən" ("Incomplete Help") are known to us.

Later, Vazirov published his previously completed comedies "Daldan atılan daş topuğa dəyər" and "Sonrakı peşmançılıq fayda verməz" in book form in Shusha. In 1895, after arriving in Baku, Najaf bey worked alongside many intellectuals of the time, such as N. Narimanov, S. M. Qanizadə, and H. Mahmudbeyov. After moving to Baku, he wrote the comedies "Yağışdan çıxdıq, yağmura düşdük" ("We Came Out from the Rain, and Fell into the Rain," 1895) and "Pehlivanani-zemane" (1898–1900), as well as the tragedy "Müsibəti-Fəxrəddin" ("The Tragedy of Fakhreddin," 1896). "Müsibəti-Fəxrəddin" is considered the first tragedy in Azerbaijani literature, while "Pehlivanani-zemane" is the first dramatic work depicting the life of the national bourgeoisie and the merchant-bourgeois figure concerning Baku oil.

The play "Yağışdan çıxdıq, yağmura düşdük" (1895) is particularly interesting as it vividly characterizes the first stage (1874–1895) of the writer's dramatic creation. The enlightened character of this period's dramaturgy becomes apparent in the analysis of this play. Najaf bey Vazirov's second period of creativity began in 1902 with the farce "Ağa Kərim xan Ərdəbili." This farce is actually based on the famous comedy "L'Avare" ("The Miser") by the French playwright Jean-Baptiste Molière. However, Najaf bey managed to imbue the work with a strong national spirit and create colorful and typical artistic images.

The first Russian revolution and the "Awakening Asia" period in the East are characterized in N. Vazirov's enlightenment as a phase of increased social-public activism. As one of the first correspondents of "Akinchi," Najaf bey frequently wrote for various newspapers and journals of the new era, such as "Həyat" ("Life"), "Tazə həyat" ("New Life"), "İrşad" ("Guidance"), "Yeni Irşad" ("New Guidance"), "Tərəqqi" ("Progress"), "Sədayi-həqq" ("Voice of Truth"), "Açıq söz" ("Open Word"), and "El həyatı" ("The Life of the People"). Readers are already familiar with the signature "Dərviş" as it appears beneath a series of articles published under the title "Balaca mütəfəqqirələr" ("Little Enlighteners").

On the one hand, Najaf bey attempted to address the problems emerging in public life through his writings in newspapers, while on the other hand, he sought to convey the necessity of modernizing outdated thoughts through his theatrical works. His plays written during this period, such as "Vay şəlküm məəlləküm" (1909), "Nə əkərsən, onu biçərsən" ("You Reap What You Sow," 1911), and "Keçmişdə qaçaqlar" ("Fugitives in the Past," 1912), are works that still reflect enlightened aesthetics. Additionally, he translated the work "The Death of Ivan the Terrible" (1910) by Russian writer Tolstoy into Azerbaijani Turkish under the title "Yavuz İvan." Najaf bey’s activities during this period draw attention as significant nuances expressing his diversity in genre and form.

=== Final stage of creativity ===
The third period of Najaf bey Vazirov's literary creativity is also considered productive. In the final stage of his dramaturgical work, he wrote the plays "Pul düşkünü Hacı Fərəc" ("The Money-Loving Haji Faraj," 1912) and "Təzə əsrin ibtidası" ("The Beginning of the New Century," 1920). The play "Mehdi xan Tabasarani" remained unfinished and incomplete at the end of his life. In "Təzə əsrin ibtidası," written in the early years of the Soviet era, Najaf bey Vazirov portrays the landlord mentality and the workers' way of thinking from a new perspective. Here, we witness a new phase in the lives of the social classes that Najaf bey had long been tracing in history – both the aristocrats and the peasants. Although the influence of the prevailing social and literary trends is clearly felt in the title and content of the work, Vazirov remains faithful to the logical-aesthetic consistency expressed in his artistic creativity up to that point.

== Works ==
=== Dramas ===
Ev tərbiyəsinin bir şəkli (A Form of Home Education). Najaf bey Vazirov wrote the play "Ev tərbiyəsinin bir şəkli" in 1875 in Yerevan. This work, written in Azerbaijani Turkish using the Arabic alphabet, was first published in 1901 in the book Təsnifat-ı Najaf bey Vəzirzadə. The book is currently preserved at the National Library of Azerbaijan named after Mirza Fatali Akhundzade. The play is written as a one-act work. In 1914, it was translated into Russian and published in the magazine Восточный сборник (Vostochnyy Sbornik) in Moscow. The play revolves around conflicts between the coarse and uncultured father Bayraməli bəy and his lazy and ill-mannered sons, Səftərqulu and Rəsul. It depicts family relationships, father-son confrontations, and the consequences of poor upbringing.

Daldan atılan daş topuğa dəyər (A Stone Thrown from Behind Hits the Heel). Completed by Najaf bey Vazirov in 1890, this play consists of four acts. Written in Azerbaijani Turkish using the Arabic script, it was also composed in Russian, with the date of 1893 noted. The work was first published in 1893 at an Armenian printing house in Shusha. In the 1970 book Najaf bey Vazirov, published in Baku by the Ministry of Culture of the Azerbaijan Soviet Socialist Republic, it is stated that "Daldan atılan daş topuğa dəyər" was included in the 1901 collection Təsnifat-ı Nəcəf Vəzirzadə, but the play is not among the five comedies listed in that volume.In this play, Vazirov exposes the widespread practice of witchcraft in society, particularly among landlord families. The play concludes with the triumph of modernity over tradition, as Xırda xanım, realizing she has been deceived, expels Nurcahan and the dervish Heydərəli.

Adı var özü yox (It Has a Name but No Essence). Written in 1891 in Azerbaijani Turkish using the Arabic script, "Adı var özü yox" is a four-act comedy. Along with four other works (Pəhləvanani-zəmanə, Müsibəti-Fəxrəddin, Yağışdan çıxdıq, yağmura düşdük, and Ev tərbiyəsinin bir şəkli), it was published in the collection Təsnifat-ı Najaf bey Vəzirzadə in 1901 in Baku. This play introduces a new theme to Azerbaijani theater history: the decline of the world of landlords and beys, reflecting the societal transformations of the time.

Yağışdan çıxdıq, yağmura düşdük (Out of the Rain, into the Downpour). Started in 1875 and completed in 1895, this comedy by Najaf bey was written in Azerbaijani Turkish using the Arabic alphabet in four acts. It is one of Vazirov’s most frequently staged works. The play was included in the 1901 collection Təsnifat-ı Najaf bey Vəzirzadə, published in Baku. The play depicts significant events that occurred in Azerbaijan during the 1880s–1890s.

Pəhləvanani-zəmanə. This is the first work in Azerbaijani literature to take the oil industry as its subject. Written between 1898–1900 in Azerbaijani Turkish using the Arabic script, it is a four-act play. The work was first published in the 1901 collection Təsnifat-ı Najaf bey Vəzirzadə. During the time of its writing, Vazirov was working as a lawyer in Baku, a period marked by numerous court cases related to oil issues. In this play, the writer reflects the development of Baku’s oil industry and its bourgeoisie through the character of Aslan bəy, capturing many typical characteristics of the 1880s–1890s. Although Vazirov completed Pəhləvanani-zəmanə in 1900, he had previously written an article on the same topic. In 1890, he published an article titled "Bakıda Vəkillik" (Advocacy in Baku) in the Russian-language newspaper Kaspi. The article strongly resembles the themes of Pəhləvanani-zəmanə, criticizing the deceptive practices of lawyers and highlighting the ignorance of the people.

The first tragedy of Azerbaijani literature, Müsibəti-Fəxrəddin ("The Tragedy of Fakhraddin"), holds significant importance for both Najaf Bey Vazirov's creative legacy and the development of Azerbaijani theater. Written in Azerbaijani Turkish using the Arabic script in 1896, this work consists of six acts. The play was included in Najaf Bey Vazirov's collection titled Təsnifatı Nəcəf bəy Vəzirzadə ("The Classifications of Najaf Bey Vazirzada"), which he published in Baku in 1901 as a single volume. The first person to become familiar with the play's content was the renowned Azerbaijani playwright Abdurrahim bey Hagverdiyev. In July 1895, while returning to Baku from Tiflis, Hagverdiyev met with Vazirov. During their conversation, the two writers exchanged their newly written works. However, Hagverdiyev did not approve of the initial title of Vazirov's tragedy. He suggested changing the title from Çəkmə, çəkə bilməzsən, bərkdir fələğin yayı ("Do Not Pull, You Cannot Handle It, the Bow of Fate Is Firm") to Müsibəti-Fəxrəddin ("The Tragedy of Fakhraddin"). Vazirov liked the suggestion, and thus, the play entered history in 1896 as the first tragedy of Azerbaijani theater.

In writing this play, the author was inspired by conservative customs and the societal backwardness he observed in Azerbaijani life. Vazirov vividly and critically depicted the dire consequences of reactionary thought in the play. The protagonist, Fakhraddin, who symbolizes progress and modernity, is portrayed in his struggle against ignorance. Fakhraddin represents the ideal vision of a new way of life, but he faces the resistance of outdated traditions and thought patterns. Through the character of Fakhraddin, Vazirov criticizes the old moral codes dominating society.

Vazirov also expressed his desire to escape the hardships created by archaic laws and achieve a cultured life. This aspiration was closely tied to the character of Fakhraddin. The importance of Müsibəti-Fəxrəddin lies not only in introducing a new thematic tragedy to Azerbaijani literature but also in creating positive characters like the enlightened Azerbaijani youth, Fakhraddin and Saadat Khanum. These characters embody the ideals Vazirov wished to see in Azerbaijani society.

In 1902, the tragedy was staged under Vazirov's personal supervision, with participation from prominent artists such as Huseyn Arablinski and Huseyngulu Sarabski. In November 1916, the play was staged again with Mirza Aga Aliyev in the cast. During rehearsals, Vazirov attended daily, providing necessary guidance. However, no female actress was available to play the role of Huru Nana (Grandmother Huru).

In addition to Müsibəti-Fəxrəddin, Vazirov authored other dramatic works such as Vay şələküm məəlləküm, Nə əkərsən onu biçərsən, Keçmişdə qaçaqlar, Təzə əsrin ibtidası, Pül düşkünü Hacı Fərəc, and Mehdi xan Tabasarani. Some sources claim that Vazirov also wrote plays such as Şəhər və Kənd ("City and Village"), Vətən ("Homeland"), and İsrafil və Şərəf ("Israfiil and Sharaf"). However, these works are neither found in his personal archives nor included in the Nəcəf bəy Vəzirov əsərləri ("Works of Najaf Bey Vazirov") books published in 1954 and 2005. This topic was only mentioned in a 1955 article by Feyzulla Gasimzade in the Ədəbiyyat və İncəsənət ("Literature and Art") newspaper. However, there is no conclusive evidence confirming whether these plays belong to Vazirov.

Short stories

While studying in Moscow, Najaf Bey Vazirov not only wrote dramatic works but also authored short stories. His stories, particularly Mənim Vaqiəm (My Story) and Paho! (Wow!), gained wide readership. The story Mənim Vaqiəm, written in 1876, holds significant value in the development of 19th-century Azerbaijani prose.

His first story, Ağıçı (The Wailer), was written during his student years. Vazirov sent this story to Hasan Bey Zardabi on August 28, 1875, for publication in the Akinchi newspaper. This story provides insight into Vazirov's early creative endeavors and is considered a contribution to the history of realist prose. Ağıçı is regarded as one of Najaf Bey's first literary experiments. The story deals with professional mourners hired to lament at funerals in exchange for payment. Vazirov presents this practice with an ironic perspective. The theme of Ağıçı was inspired by the social realities of 19th-century Azerbaijani life.

Mənim Vaqiəm. The author's second story, Mənim Vaqiəm, was also written during his student years in Moscow. Considered more successful than his first work, Vazirov sent this story to Hasan bey Zardabi in 1876 for publication in Akinchi. However, due to its harsh critique of teachers and mollas, Zardabi refrained from publishing it in the newspaper.

Paho!. The author's last story, Paho, written in 1884, differs in style from his previous works. This story was published in the Ziyayi-Qafqaziyyə newspaper in 1884. Composed entirely of monologues, it addresses the growing issue of theft in Azerbaijani society in the 1880s. This short story begins and ends with a conversation between the author and a character named Karbalayi. Vazirov often used the character of Karbalayi in his other writings. In the story, Karbalayi justifies his actions of taking others' belongings through various arguments. Surprised by Karbalayi’s reasoning, the author named the story Paho.

Translations

Najaf Bey Vazirov did not confine his artistic career to the literary environment of his own nation but sought to broaden his worldview by reading numerous works in Russian and French. In 1910, he translated the famous Russian writer A.K. Tolstoy’s work The Death of Ivan the Terrible (Иван Грозный) from Russian into Azerbaijani Turkish under the title Yavuz İvan (Ivan the Stern). However, this work is not preserved in the archive of the Institute of Manuscripts named after M. Fuzuli at the Azerbaijan National Academy of Sciences. Furthermore, no information about this work exists in the books written about Najaf Bey. It is presumed that the work was lost after it was written. The only known information about the play is that it was a translation and belonged to the drama genre.

One of Vazirov’s two important translations, Ağa Kərim xan Ərdəbilli (Aga Karim Khan of Ardabil), is considered a significant work in the history of Azerbaijani theater in terms of its theme. This work is the second play written on the theme of greed after Mirza Fatali Akhundov’s comedy Hacı Qara (Haji Gara). In Ağa Kərim xan Ərdəbilli, which was adapted from the French writer Molière's comedy L’Avare (The Miser), Najaf Bey borrowed the plot and progression of events from Molière's play but infused the work with a national spirit through the depiction and presentation of characters. In this sense, Ağa Kərim xan Ərdəbilli stands out with its originality in many aspects.There are varying opinions about the date of this work’s creation. Kamran Mammadov’s book, published in 1995, states that the play was written and staged in 1902. However, Feyzulla Gasimzade suggests that it was written in 1908 and evaluates it as Najaf Bey’s first work after the 1905 Russian Revolution. The play, written in Azerbaijani Turkish using the Arabic alphabet, consists of four acts. Ağa Kərim xan Ərdəbilli was first published in 1935 as part of Najaf Bey Vazirov’s collected works.

Najaf Bey’s other translated play, Dələduz (The Fraud), is an adaptation of the French folk drama La Farce de Maître Pathelin (The Farce of Master Pathelin), believed to have been written in the 15th century. The exact date of the play’s writing is unknown. The manuscript is preserved in Najaf Bey Vazirov’s archive at the Institute of Manuscripts named after Fuzuli. The play, written in Azerbaijani Turkish using the Arabic alphabet, consists of three acts. It was first published in 1954 in Feyzulla Gasimzade’s book Najaf Bey Vazirov. The word Dələduz signifies a cunning and deceitful person. Upon reading the text, one gets the impression that the play is unfinished. Its theme is drawn from the lives of Azerbaijani merchants. Enriched with national elements, the play exposes the deceit and fraud present in the lives of merchants.

== Sources ==
- Məmmədov, Kamran (1995). Nəcəf bəy Vəzirov (in Azerbaijani). Bakı: Azərnəşr. ISBN 5-552-00920-7.
- Vəzirov, Nəcəf bəy (2005). Məmmədova, Dilarə (ed.). Əsərləri (PDF) (in Azerbaijani). Bakı: “Şərq-Qərb”.
- Məmmədov, Xeyrulla (1991). Nəcəf bəy Vəzirov Seçilmiş əsərləri (in Azerbaijani). Bakı: Maarif nəşriyyatı.
- Vəzirov, Nəcəf bəy (1960). Bağırov, Məmmədağa (ed.). Məqalə və felyetonlar (in Azerbaijani). Bakı: Azərbaycan Üniversiteti Nəşriyyatı.
- Rəhimil, İlham (2003). ÜÇ ƏSRİN YÜZ OTUZ İLİ (Akademik Milli Dram Teatrı bu gün) (PDF) (in Azerbaijani). Bakı: “QAPP-POLİQRAF”.
- Rəhimli, İlham (2005). AZƏRBAYCAN TEATR TARİXİ (PDF) (in Azerbaijani). Bakı: Çaşıoğlu.
- Məmmədov, S. (1960). Həyat səhifələri (in Azerbaijani). Bakı. pp. 70–76.
- Əsgərli, Zaman (1998). Nəcəf bəy Vəzirov (in Azerbaijani). Bakı: Şuşa nəşriyyatı.
- Əsgərli, Zaman (1985). Nəcəf bəy Vəzirovun "Müsibəti-Fəxrəddin" faciəsi (in Azerbaijani). Bakı: Elm.
- Aşırlı, Akif (2009). Azərbaycan Mətbuatı Tarixi (1875-1920) (in Azerbaijani). Bakı: Elm və Təhsil Nəşriyyatı.
- Quliyeva, Mehri (2021). XX əsrin əvvəlləri Azərbaycan hekayəsinin poetikası (PDF) (in Azerbaijani). Bakı: AZƏRBAYCAN MİLLİ ELMLƏR AKADEMİYASI NİZAMİ GƏNCƏVİ ADINA ƏDƏBİYYAT İNSTİTUTU.
- Qasımzadə, Feyzulla (2017). XIX əsr Azərbaycan ədəbiyyatı (in Azerbaijani) (2-ci nəşr ed.). Bakı: Elm və Təhsil. ISBN 978-9952-8176-2-1.
- Həsən, Quliyev (2010). Azərbaycan ədəbiyyatı (in Russian). Bakı: Elm və Təhsil.
- Театральная энциклопедия (in Russian). Vol. I. Moskva. 1961.
- Sultanlı, Əli (1960). Азербайcан Едебийаты Тарихи (in Azerbaijani). Vol. II. Bakı: Азербайcан ССР Eлимлер Академийасы Нещриййаты.
- Sultanlı, Əli (1948-04-12). "Ostrovski və Azərbaycan dramaturgiyası". Ədəbiyyat qəzeti. 10.
- Məmmədov, Mehdi (1956). "Böyük Rus Dramaturqu". Azərbaycan jurnalı. 6: 145–153.
- Məmmədova, Leyla (2021). "Xalq deyimləri Nəcəf bəy Vəzirov komediyalarının meyarı kimi". Bakı Slavyan Universitetinin Elmi Əsərləri. 1: 206–210.
- Ələkbərova, Əzizə (2019). "NƏCƏF BƏY VƏZİROV ƏSƏRLƏRİNDƏ MİLLİ ÖZÜNÜDƏRK" (PDF). Əlyazmalar yanmır. 2 (9): 73–77.
- Saraçlı, Mətanət (2008). "N.Vəzirov yaradıcılığında xalqın milli özünüdərki" (PDF). Bakı Universitetinin Xəbərləri. 4: 44–48.
- Qarayev, Yaşar (1999). Belli başlı dönemleri ve zirve şahsiyetleriyle Azerbaycan edebiyatı (in Turkish). İstanbul: Ötüken Neşriyat. ISBN 9754372845.
- Qurbanov, Şıxəli (1964). Этапы развития азербайджано-русских литературных связей в XIX в (in Russian). Изд-во Академии наук Азербайджанской ССР.
- Zəkiyeva, Aygün (2019). "NƏCƏF BƏY VƏZİROVUN "MÜSİBƏTİ-FƏXRƏDDİN" ƏSƏRİNDƏ DRAMATURJİ KONFLİKT". "Elm, mədəniyyət və təhsil: XXI əsrdə elmin inkişafının aktual məsələləri" BEYNƏLXALQ ELMİ-PRAKTİK KONFRANSIN MATERİALLARI (in Azerbaijani). ISBN 978-605-031-620-9.
- Najaf bey Vazirov
