= Zardab (city) =

Zərdab
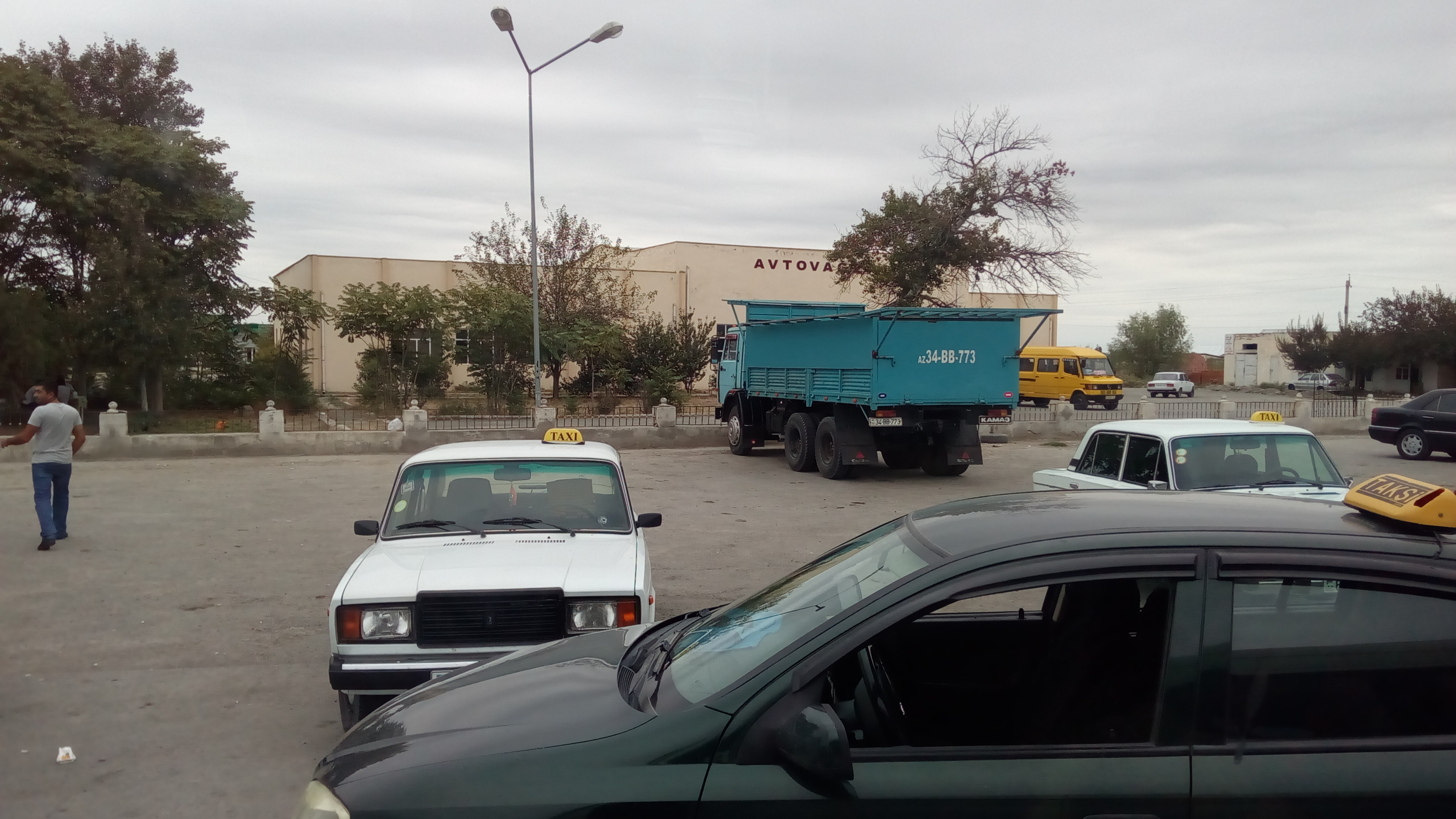
- Zardab Bus Station

- Location within Azerbaijan
- Coordinates: 40°13′06″N 47°42′30″E
- Country: Azerbaijan
- District: Zardab
- Established: 1968
- Elevation: −3 m (−9.8 ft)

Population (2010)
  - Total: 11,658
- Time zone: UTC+4 (AZT)
- Area code: +994 020 29

Zərdab (Zardab) is a city in and the capital of the Zardab District of Azerbaijan.

== Notable natives ==
- Hasan bey Zardabi — publicist, founder of Akinchi, the first newspaper fully printed in Azerbaijani language.
