= Ganja State University =

University in Azerbaijan

Coordinates: 40°40′41.0″N 46°21′36.6″E

- Gəncə Dövlət Universiteti
- Type: Public
- Established: 1938; 87 years ago
- Rector: Yusif Yusibov
- Students: 5237
- Undergraduates: 4961
- Postgraduates: 276
- Doctoral students: 43
- Location: AZ-2001, Gəncə şəhəri, Heydər Əliyev prosekti 429, Ganja, Azerbaijan
- Campus: Urban
- Website: www.gdu.edu.az

Ganja State University (GDU, Azerbaijani: Gəncə Dövlət Universiteti) is a public university in Ganja, Azerbaijan. Officially accredited and recognized by the Ministry of Science and Education of Azerbaijan), Ganja State University is a medium-sized (uniRank enrollment range: 6,000-6,999 students) coeducational higher education institution. The university offers courses and programs leading to officially recognized higher education degrees such as bachelor degrees, master degrees, and doctorate degrees in several areas of study. The 80 years old higher-education institution has a selective admission policy based on entrance examinations. The admission rate range is 80-90% making this Azerbaijani higher education organization a least selective institution. There are 20 doctors and professors, 156 doctoral candidates and associate professors, and 150 assistant professors and lecturers in the 26 departments of the university. The university has a library, several computer rooms and laboratories. The university ranks as 19th best nationwide and 8547th best worldwide.

== History ==
According to the resolution of the Soviet of People's Commissars of Azerbaijan from April 14, 1938, a two-year pedagogical institute named after Nadezhda Krupskaya was established in the city of Ganja, Azerbaijan. Due to a lack of space, the college was placed on the third floor of Gorky School. The first two departments of the institute were the Natural Sciences Department and the Department of Physics and Mathematics. Twenty-three teachers were hired to teach at the institute. The first class of 244 students started on October 1, 1938. In 1939, the departments of History and Azerbaijani language and literature were established in the institute. On September 1, 1943, the two-year college was abolished and a four-year Kirovobad (Ganja) State Pedagogical Institute was established on its basis. In the fall of 1943, the institute was named after a renowned scientist and publicist of Azerbaijan Hasan bey Zardabi.

=== University ===
On June 13, 2000, the President of Azerbaijan renamed the institute Ganja State University. Ganja State University offers 41 bachelor programs, 63 master programs, and 36 Ph.D. programs. There are 8 faculties and 31 departments in the university. The university has 7692 students who are currently studying in three cycle system. There are 5 academic campuses and on these campuses, there are facilities such as libraries, gyms, dormitories, and youth centers. Several centers function in the university to promote students’ academic success. For example, centers such as Training and learning center, E-learning center, Student ombudsman center, centre for students with disabilities, Electron education center, Career and internship center, Language resource center, and several others centers operate in order to assist students to increase their performance.

== Faculty Departments ==
- Faculty of Mathematics and Informatics
- Faculty of Physics and Technical Subjects
- Faculty of Chemistry and Biology
- Faculty of Philology
- Faculty of History and Geography
- Faculty of Foreign Languages
- Faculty of Pedagogy
- Faculty of Economics and Management

=== Majors ===
- Mathematics (bachelor, 4 years)
- Mathematical Informatics (Bachelor, 4 years)
- Mathematical Physics (Bachelor, 4 years)
- Physics (bachelor, 4 years)
- Vocational education (higher education - 5 years)
- Geography (bachelor, 4 years)
- Economics (bachelor, 4 years)
- History (bachelor, 4 years)
- Azerbaijan language and literature (bachelor, 4 years)
- English (bachelor, 4 years)
- French (Bachelor, 4 years)
- Russian (bachelor, 4 years)
- Biology (bachelor, 4 years)
- Chemistry (bachelor, 4 years)
- Chemistry-biology (bachelor, 4 years)
- Pedagogy and elementary education (higher education - 5 years)
- Pedagogy and Psychology (higher education - 5 years)
- Preschool education psychology and pedagogy (higher education - 5 years)
- Music Education (higher education - 5 years)
- Drawing and fine arts (higher education - 5 years)
- Basic military and physical training (higher education - 5 years).

=== Organizations ===
The organizations of GSU help to support organizational and development initiatives for all members of the University’s staff communities.

- YAP GSU
- Student Youth Organization
- Student Union

== International Relations ==
In recent years, international relations have led to cohesion with educational and scientific institutions in foreign countries. GSU has collaborations with various associations and institutions. In 1995, the International Relations Department was established at Ganja State University. Since then, GDU has been involved in the EU-funded "TEMPUS" capacity building and Erasmus Mundus exchange mobility programmes.

International relations have been expanded within the framework of the European Union-funded Erasmus-Mundus Program, "Student's, Master's, Post-graduate, Doctorate Preparation, Professors and Teachers' Project for Increasing Scientific Capabilities and Theoretical Knowledge in European Universities". The project is implemented by consortium members and universities of the Netherlands, France, Italy, Portugal, Greece, Bulgaria, Lithuania, Latvia, Azerbaijan, and Georgia. Ganja State University, Khazar University, and Tourism Universities participate in the consortium from Azerbaijan.

=== International Projets ===
Since last decades Ganja State University has been actively enrolled to EU funded projects.

Programme or initiative	Reference number	Title of the project	Duration
Erasmus Mundus LOT 5,6	Erasmus Mundus Action 2 – Strand 1	Exchange mobility between European and Eastern Partnership Country HEIs”	2008-2012
Tempus-RITSA	511329-TEMPUS-1-2010-1-AZ-TEMPUS-JPCR	“Reforming interpretation and translation studies in Azerbaijan”	2010-2013
Tempus-CURDEUS	530385-TEMPUS-1-2012-1-AZ-TEMPUS-JPCR	“Curriculum Development and Capacity Building in EU Studies”	2012-2015
Erasmus Mundus WEBB	Erasmus Mundus Action 2 Lot 5 – Strand 1	“Whole Europe Beyond Borders”	2012-2017
Tempus-UNİVİA	543893-TEMPUS-1-2013-1-AZ-TEMPUS-SMGR	“Development and Improvement of the University Administration on International Relations”	2013-2016
Tempus-ESFİDİP	543649-TEMPUS-1-2013-1-AZ-TEMPUS-JPGR	“Establishment of a Foundation for the Integration of Disabled People into HEIs of Azerbaijan”	2013-2016
Erasmus Plus “Overseas”		“Academic Exchange Opportunity at Pavia University”	2015-2016
Tempus- AESOP	561640-EPP-1-2015-1-AZ-EPPKA2-CBHE-JP	“Advocacy Establishment for Students through Ombudsman Position”	2015-2018

=== Partner Universities and Organizations ===
- DAAD Organization in Germany
- Cultural Department of the French Embassy
- Embassy of the Republic of Germany
- European Language Training Center" on the "Tasis" Program
- Nottingham Trent University
- Kars Caucasus University
- NLBA

== Campus ==
Ganja State University is a public (state) university. It has 5 campuses, which are located in the central part of Ganja city. The main campus building is located in the very center of Ganja city.

== Affiliations ==
The university is a member of the Caucasus University Association.
