= Sakina Akhundzadeh =

Azerbaijani playwright

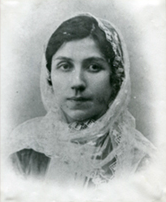
- Born: 1865; Quba
- Died: 1927 (aged 61–62); Quba
- Education: Quba
- Occupations: Teacher and playwright

Sakina Mirza Heybat qizi Akhundzadeh (Azerbaijani: Səkinə Axundzadə) (1865 in Quba – 1927 in Quba) was an Azerbaijani playwright. She was the first known female playwright and dramatist in Azerbaijani literature.

== Life and contributions ==
Sakina Akhundzadeh was homeschooled by her father, who was a poet writing under the pen-name Fada. She went to Baku (present-day capital of Azerbaijan), where she became one of the first teachers at the Empress Alexandra Russian Muslim Boarding School for Girls, established in 1901, where she taught Azeri, literature and religious studies. This was an important appointment, as the school was the first secular school for Muslim girls in the entire Russian Empire. It had opened only because the Azeri oil magnate Zeynalabdin Taghiyev had funded it, and it is said that the school was named after he had written a letter to Czarina Alexandra. The local theatre was also funded by Taghiyev.

She began her career as a playwright upon founding a drama club at that school and adapting her plays to stage performance by the students. Her first play entitled Elmin manfaati ("The Benefit of Science") was staged for the first time in 1904. Encouraged by the successful performance, Akhundzadeh went on to write more plays; among them, Hagg soz aji olar ("Truth Hurts") and Galin va gayinana ("Daughter-in-Law and Mother-in-Law"). This was a time of change, in 1901, Baku had seen the first female actresses appearing without veils. Following a more liberal approach by the Czarist government, freedoms such as the first magazine written by and for women was seen in 1911. Sakina was to be acknowledged as the first feminist playwright, with many of her plays dealing with the plight of Azeri women.

In 1911, Huseyn Arablinski staged Akhundzadeh's remake of Namık Kemal's play Zavallı çocuk (Bakhtsiz ushag in Azeri, "The Unfortunate Kid"), which soon began being performed in amateur theatres outside the Caucasus. She continued to work with Arablinski until his death in 1919, as well as with Abbas Mirza Sharifzadeh in 1917–1922. Finally, in 1917, Akhundzadeh's Zulmun natijasi ("The Consequence of Evil"; based on Léo Delibes's opera Lakmé) was staged at the Taghiyev Theatre in Baku (nowadays Azerbaijan State Theatre of Musical Comedy). The performance was a great success and brought fame to Akhundzadeh, leading to her being recognized as the first female Azeri playwright in history.

Sakina Akhundzadeh was also known for writing fiction. In 1918, she published her novel Shahzadeh Abulfaz va Rana khanim. The novel also contained poetic verses composed of 260 hemistiches.
