= The State Archive of Literature and Art of Azerbaijan =

The State Archive of Literature and Art named after Salman Mumtaz (Azerbaijani: Salman Mumtaz adına Dövlət Ədəbiyyat və İncəsənət Arxivi) was established in 1966 in accordance with decree of the Council of Ministers of Azerbaijani SSR dated 17 July 1965. In 1996, according to decree of President of Azerbaijan, the archive was named after the prominent Azerbaijani literary scholar Salman Mumtaz.

== About ==
There are 98,215 files on 717 funds, covering the period from the end of the 19th century to 2005 in the Archive. For instance, there are personal funds of Emin Abid, Hasan bey Zardabi, Mammad Arif, Aliagha Vahid, Huseyn Javid, Mir Jalal, Jafar Jafarov, Suleyman Rustam, Mirza Ibrahimov, Rasul Rza, Sabit Rahman, Suleyman Rahimov, Islam Safarli, Mammad Said Ordubadi, Jafar Handan, Abdullah Shaig, Ismail Shikhly, Mirvarid Dilbazi, Huseyn Arif, Ali Tude and others. Materials on the history of Azerbaijani literature and art are also contained in the funds of Union of Writers of Azerbaijan, Union of Artists, Union of Sculptors, the publishing houses "Azerneshr", "Ganjlik", "Yazichi", the editorial offices of newspapers and magazines "Azerbaijan", "Literary Azerbaijan", "Azerbaijanfilm" film studio named after Jafar Jabbarli and others.

The archive also contains personal funds of Azerbaijani directors and actors: Aliagha Aghayev, Mirza Agha Aliyev, Alasgar Alakbarov, Rza Afganli, Sona Hajiyeva, Marziya Davudova, Kazim Ziya, Ismail Idayatzadeh, Fatma Qadri, Shamsi Badalbeyli, Mehdi Mammadov, Mustafa Mardanov, Ismail Osmanli, Sidgi Ruhullah, Najiba Melikova, etc.

Materials from the personal collections of such Azerbaijani composers as Fikret Amirov, Afrasiyab Badalbeyli, Soltan Hajibeyov, Niyazi, Tofig Guliyev, Gara Garayev, Suleyman Alasgarov, Asef Zeynalli, Muslim Magomayev, Said Rustamov, such singers and musicians as Rubaba Muradova, Agigat Rzayeva, Khan Shushinsky, Fatma Mukhtarova, Sara Gadimova, Shovket Alekperova, Huseynaga Hajibababekov, Bahram Mansurov, etc. are kept here too.

== See also ==
National Archive Department of Azerbaijan
