= Empress Alexandra Russian Muslim Boarding School for Girls =

Historic school in Baku

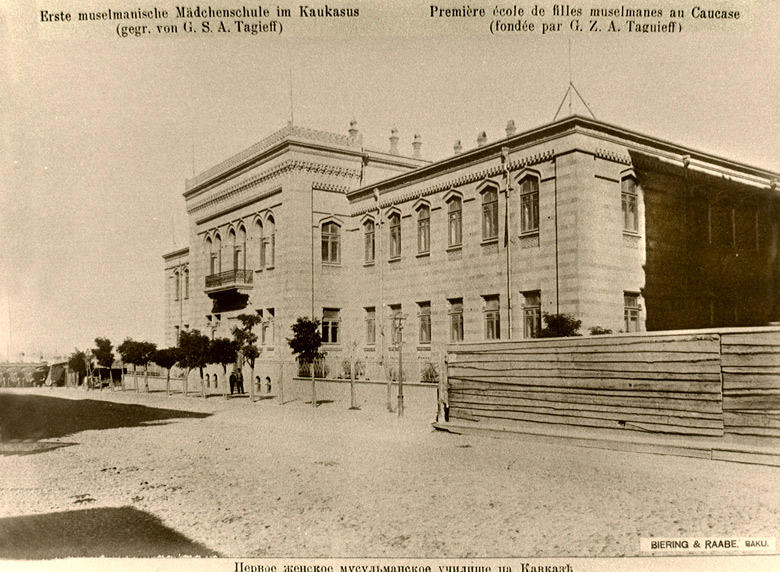
- A picture of Empress Alexandra Russian Muslim Boarding school for Girls
- Interactive map of the Empress Alexandra Russian Muslim Boarding School for Girls area

General information
- Location: Baku, Azerbaijan, Istiglaliyyat Street
- Coordinates: 40.3952°N 49.882°E
- Construction started: 1901
- Completed: 1918

Design and construction
- Architect: Specialists of “Bakinskiy rabochiy” (Baku worker) machinery plant

The Empress Alexandra Russian Muslim School for Girls (Russian: Александрийское императорское женское русско-мусульманское училище; Azerbaijani: Aleksandra imperator rus-müsəlman qız məktəbi) of Baku (present-day Azerbaijan) was the first school for Muslim girls in the Russian Empire. It was built by the Polish architect Józef Gosławski in 1901, sponsored by the Azerbaijani oil baron and philanthropist Zeynalabdin Taghiyev.

== History ==
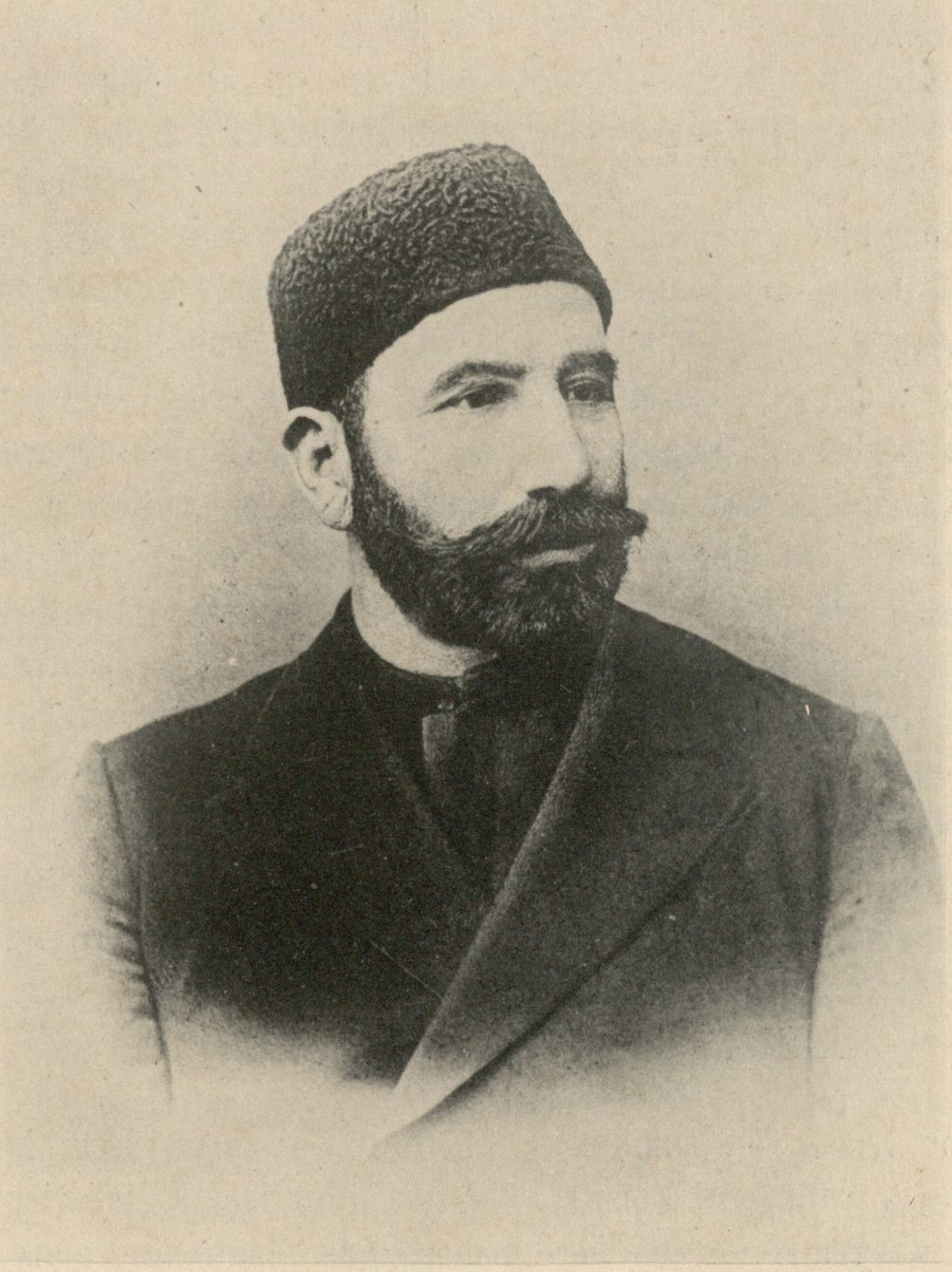
Zeynalabdin Taghiyev

Despite what might seem to have been a project worthy of much praise, Zeynalabdin Taghiyev had great difficulty in gaining permission to open the school. He met with vigorous resistance; both from the Imperial Russian authorities and the conservative Muslim clergy. Taghiyev had reportedly asked Emperor Alexander III for permission to establish such an institution, but his offer was rejected. After Alexander III's death in 1896 the oil baron sent a very expensive gift to the newly crowned Emperor Nicholas II's wife Alexandra Fyodorovna imploring her help. In appreciation, Taghiyev offered to name the school after her, and the permission was thus granted. Local resistance was fierce; families that agreed to have their daughters attend the school were being intimidated, and one of the progressive Islamic clerics who signed up both of his daughters got murdered by the conservatives.

The architectural style of the boarding school was designed by Józef Gosławski in 1896, and the construction began two years later, costing 184,000 roubles (all of which was provided by Taghiyev). It ended in 1900 however the school did not open right away. Local Muslim authorities for the most part continued to oppose the establishment of a secular all-girls school and referred to the teachings of Muslim scholars worldwide. In response, Taghiyev sent a mullah to the main places of Islamic worship, namely Mecca, Medina, Karbala, Mashhad, Cairo, Constantinople, and Teheran to meet with the world's most prominent Muslim clergy and have them sign a document in which they confirmed that Islam did not forbid Muslim girls to study secular disciplines. Upon the return of Taghiyev's envoy, the oil baron organized another meeting with Baku's imams presenting them with signatures of the eight world-renowned Islamic scholars whose teachings they were abiding by.

The school hence officially opened on September 7, 1901, and welcomed 58 females students, of whom 35 came from working-class families. The congratulatory telegramme sent to the students by the Empress put an end to all the opposition on both official and public level. Taghiyev also received congratulatory messages from scholars of Saint Petersburg, Kazan, Crimea, and Central Asia.

The students were taught mathematics, geography, music, drama, Russian and Azerbaijani languages, as well as religion, needlework, housekeeping skills and other disciplines. They lived in an in-school residence hall and visited their families once a week. In 1909, the school renewed its uniform policy, according to which the girls were required to wear European-style uniforms worn by all female students in Russia. In 1913, the school was reorganized into a post-secondary teachers seminary for women.

The pioneer project inspired Muslim communities in other parts of the Russian Empire to establish similar institutions. By 1915, there were five schools in Baku for Muslim girls.

== Notable staff ==
- Hanifa Malikova, wife of Hasan bey Zardabi, became the first principal of the school
- Maryam Sulkiewicz
- Sakina Akhundzadeh, playwright, was amongst the first set of teaching staff. She started a drama group here.
- Asmiyasoltan Hafiz Mammad Amin qizi

== Modern usage ==
The school functioned until the fall of the Empire in 1918. In the 1920s it was reorganized into a teachers' college, after 1930 it served as headquarters for various government institutions, until finally, it became the Institute of Manuscripts of the National Academy of Sciences of Azerbaijan. The institute collects, systematizes, stores and publishes analytical works related to many historical documents and exhibits that are kept in its archives. The collection includes about 40,000 works in various languages including Azerbaijani, Arabic, Persian, Ottoman Turkish, and Chagatai which provide rare insight into what scholars from the Middle Ages thought about medicine, astronomy, mathematics, poetry, philosophy, law, history and geography.

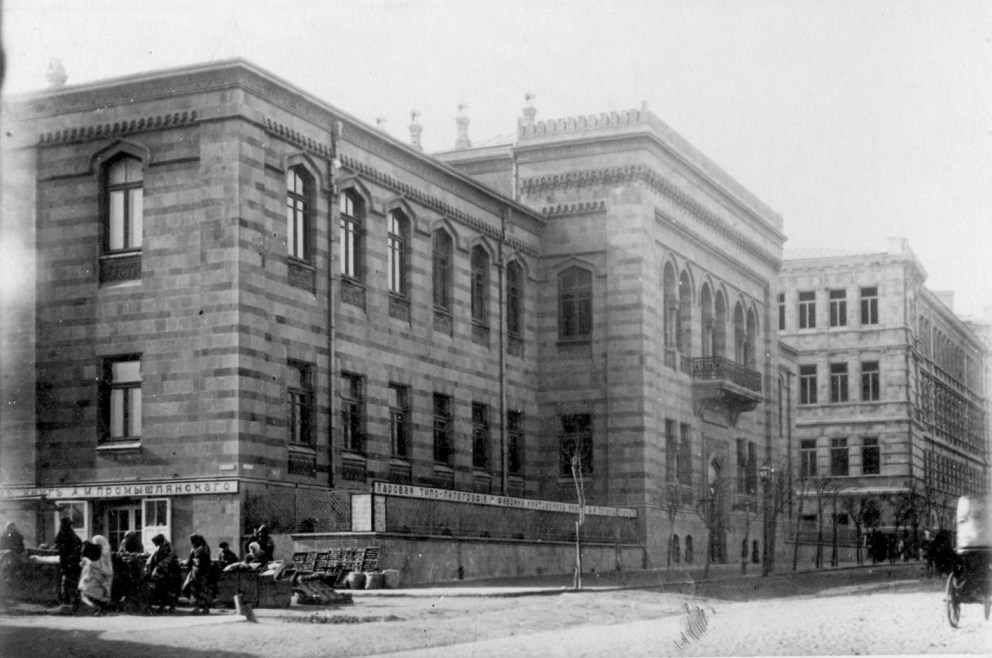
Building of the school in pre-revolutionary Baku

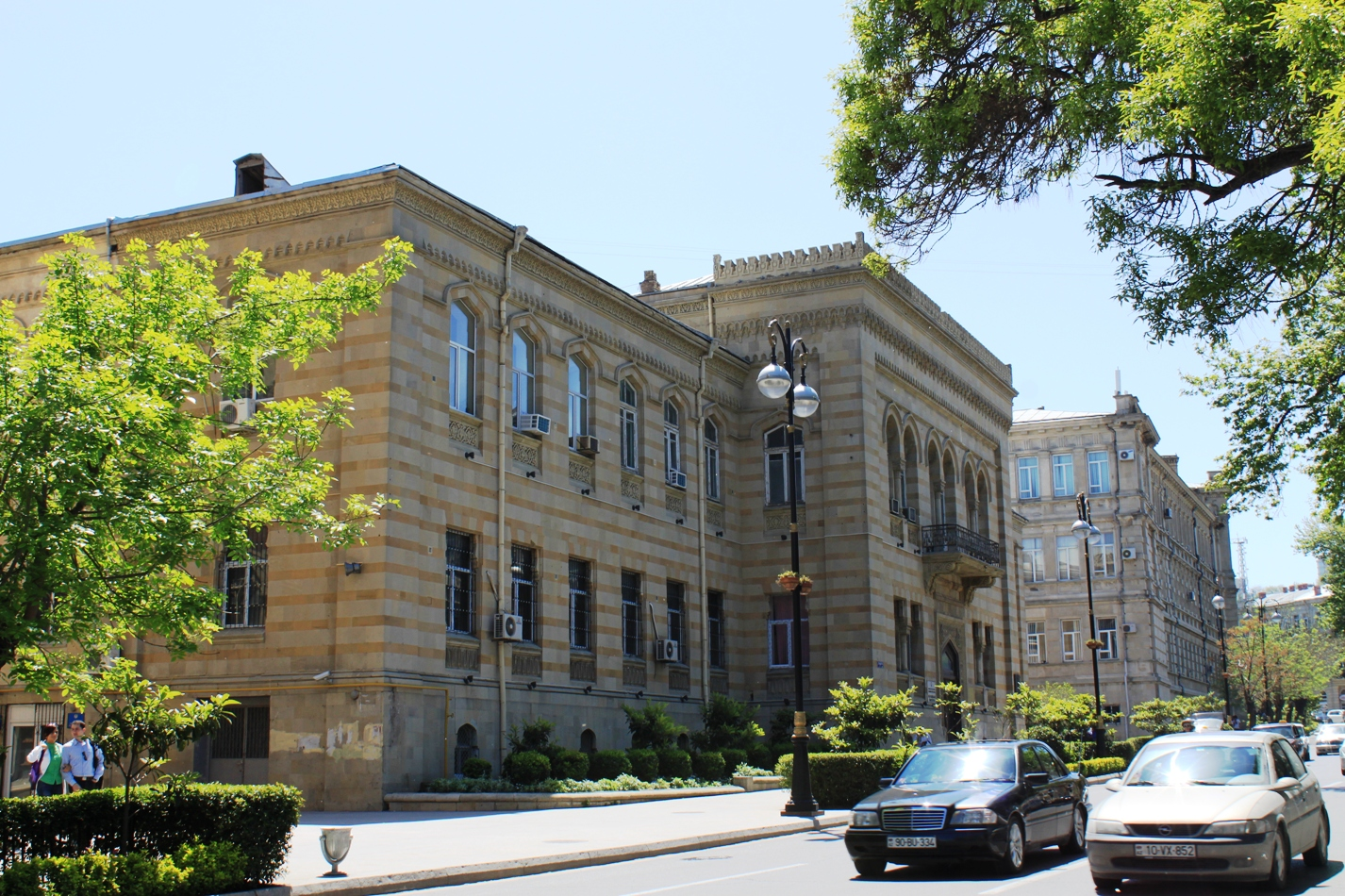
Building of the Institute of Manuscripts of the National Academy of Sciences of Azerbaijan, 2010

== Gallery ==
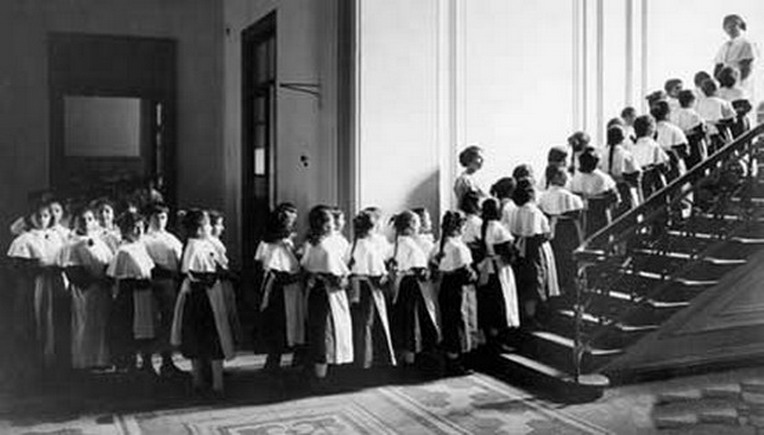
Pupils and teachers. 1902

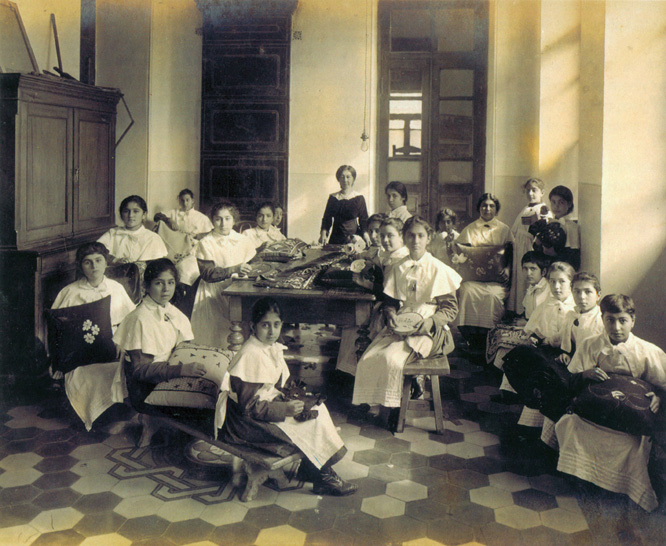
Embroidery lessons.

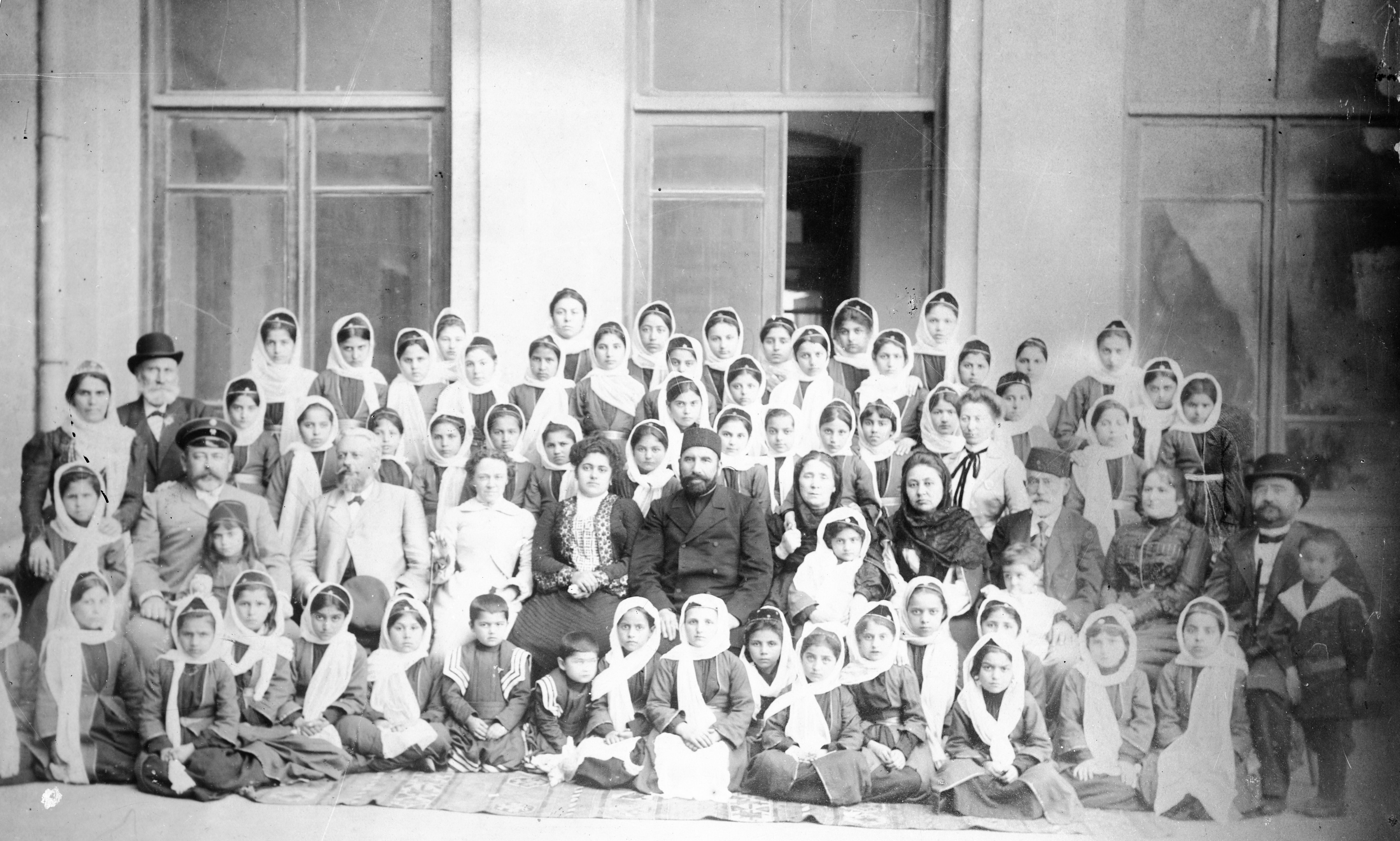
Zeynalabdin Taghiyev, his wife Sona khanim, Hasan bey Zardabi with his wife Hanifa khanim Malikova, Alimardan Topchubashov with pupils
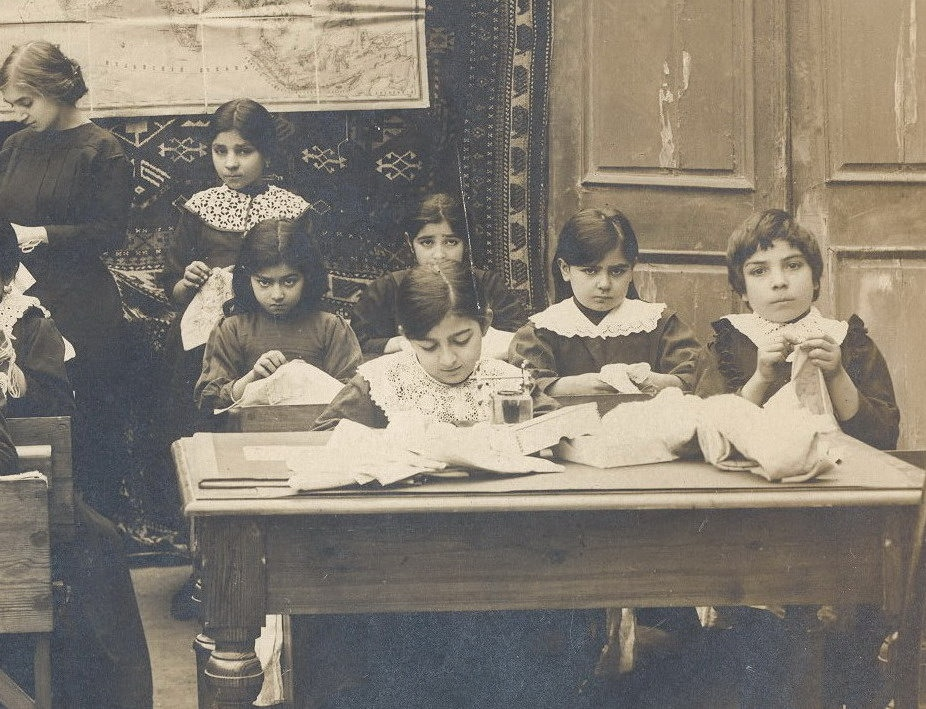
Embroidery lessons. 1911

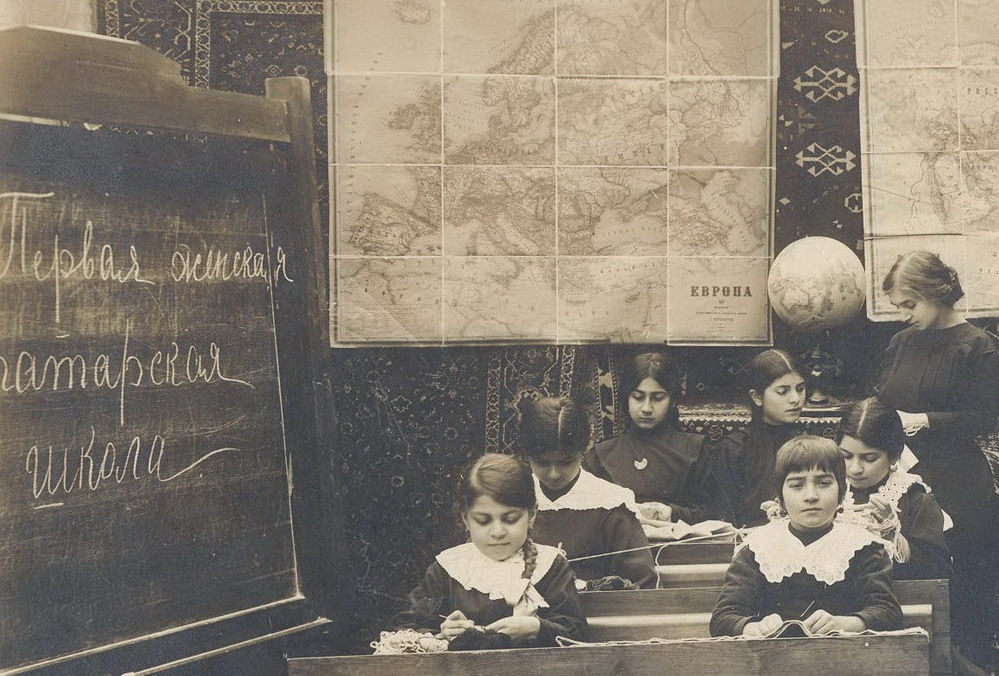
Lessons at school, in 1911. "The first Tatar school" is written on the blackboard. (Azerbaijanis were called Tatars in the beginning of the 20th century.)

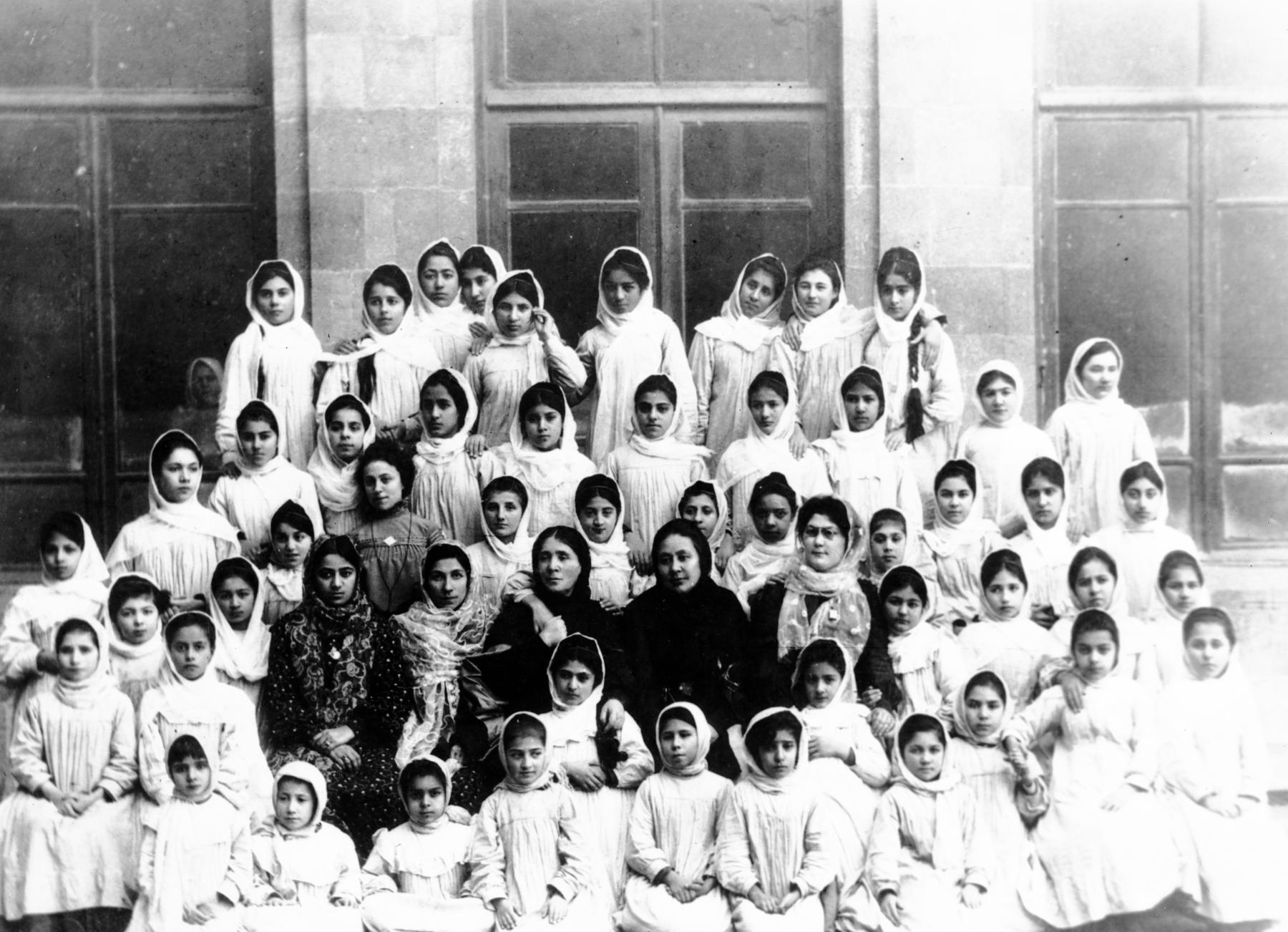
Hanifa Malikova - principal of the school among pupils
