= Institute of Manuscripts of Azerbaijan =

Azerbaijan University

- Əlyazmalar İnstitutu
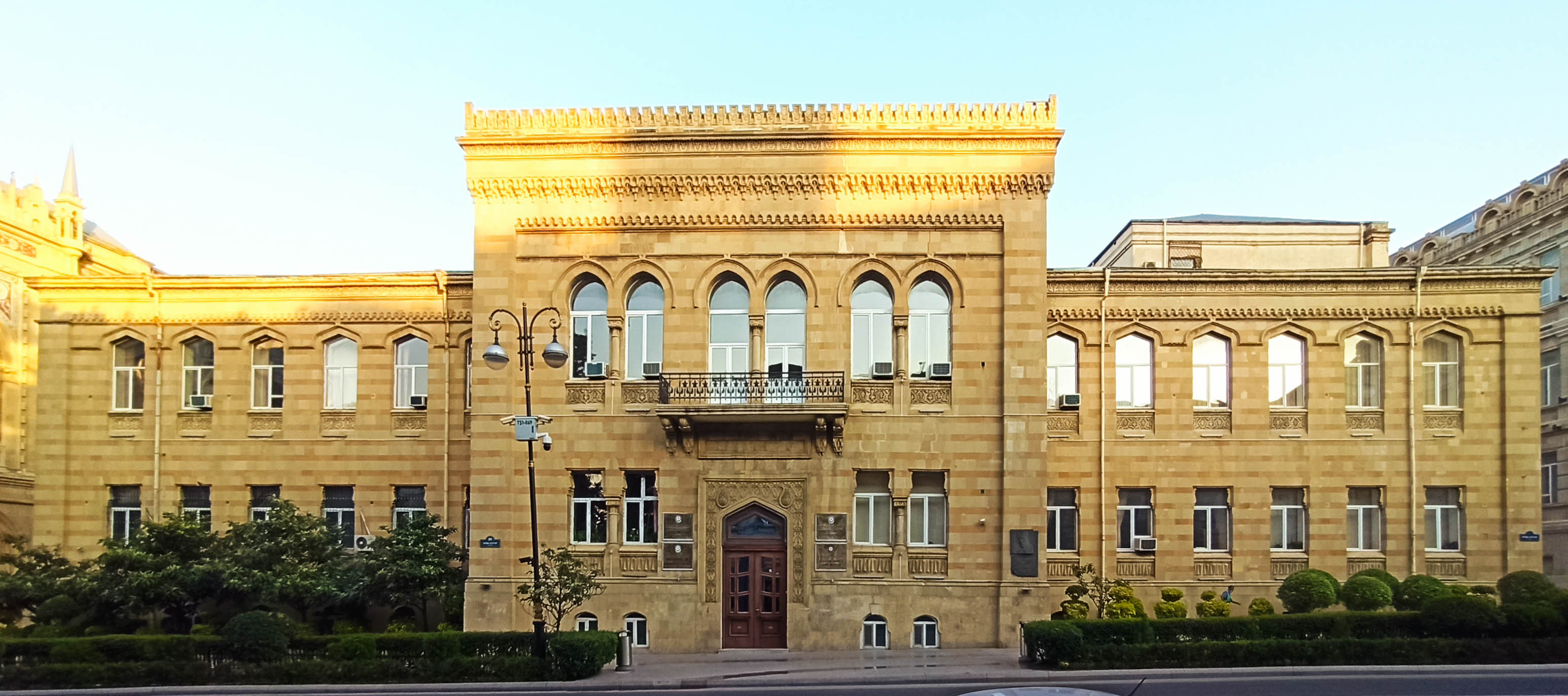
- Front of the institute
- Established: 1986
- Location: Baku, Azerbaijan
- Coordinates: 40.36852407832065°N 49.833362090184515°E
- Website: www.manuscript.az

Institute of Manuscripts (Azerbaijani: Əlyazmalar İnstitutu), named after Muhammad Fuzuli, is a scientific center of the Azerbaijan National Academy of Sciences engaged in scientific-research, archive and library science activities, security, study, translation and publication of medieval manuscripts.

The institute is located in the building of the former Empress Alexandra Russian Muslim Boarding School for Girls, established in 1901 by H.Z.Taghiyev on Istiglaliyyat Street and designed by the Polish architect Józef Gosławski.

== History ==
In 1924, during the All-Azerbaijani Regional Congress held in Baku, it was decided to found a scientific library with a special department dedicated to ancient manuscripts and rare books.

Initially, the library was a part of the Research Union of Azerbaijan, but later it was included in the Nizami Institute for Literature. In 1950, the Republican Manuscript Foundation was established under the National Academy of Sciences of Azerbaijan. In 1986, the Institute of Manuscripts of the National Academy of Sciences of Azerbaijan was established. In 1996, the institute was named in honor of the poet Muhammad Fuzuli.

Since January 2015, the institute is a member of The Islamic Manuscript Association, established by Cambridge University.

== Collections ==
The Institute of Manuscripts contains rare manuscripts covering all fields of the medieval sciences - medicine and astronomy, mathematics and mineralogy, poetics and philosophy, theology and law, grammar, history and geography, prose and poetry, in Azerbaijani, Turkish, Arabic, Persian and other languages.

There are more than 40,000 objects collected in the Institute of Manuscripts, of which about 12,000 are Arabic manuscripts that were written or rewritten between the 9th-20th centuries. In addition, the institute has preserved personal documents of prominent Azerbaijani figures from science and literature who lived in the 19th-20th centuries, historical documents, old printed books, newspapers and magazines from previous periods, microfilms and photographs. The oldest manuscript in the Institute of Manuscripts is Surah An-Nisa, written on parchment in the 9th century.

Copies of works such as Medical Laws by Abu Ali Ibn Sina, About Surgery and surgical tools and The thirtieth treatise of Abul-Gasim az-Zahravi, Supplies of Nizamshah, Gulshani-raz by Sheikh Mahmoud Shabustari, Divan by Nasimi, and Bustan by Sadi made in the 12th-15th centuries are the most ancient manuscripts preserved within the Institute of Manuscripts.

Between 2005–2017, three Azerbaijani medieval medical manuscripts held within the institute were included in UNESCO's Memory of the World Register. They were Al-Qanun Fi at-Tibb (Canon Of Medicine, The Second Book) by Abu Ali Ibn Sina (Avicenna) (transferred in 1143), Zakhirai-Nizamshahi (Supplies Of Nizamshah) by Rustam Jurjani (13th century) and Al-Makala as-Salasun (Thirteen Treatise) by Abu al-Qasim al-Zahravi (Abulcasis) (12th century).

== Structure ==
At present, in the Institute of Manuscripts is made up of 10 departments and a laboratory.

Scientific-research departments:

- Department of research of Turkish manuscripts
- Department of research of Arabian manuscripts
- Department of research of Persian manuscripts
- Department of research of personal archives
- Department of bibliology and bibliography
- Department of multidisciplinary and published books
- Department of international relations
- Department of electronic resources
- Department of scientific funds
- Department of library and scientific information

Scientific-research laboratory:

- Laboratory of hygiene and restoration
