= Hanifa Malikova =

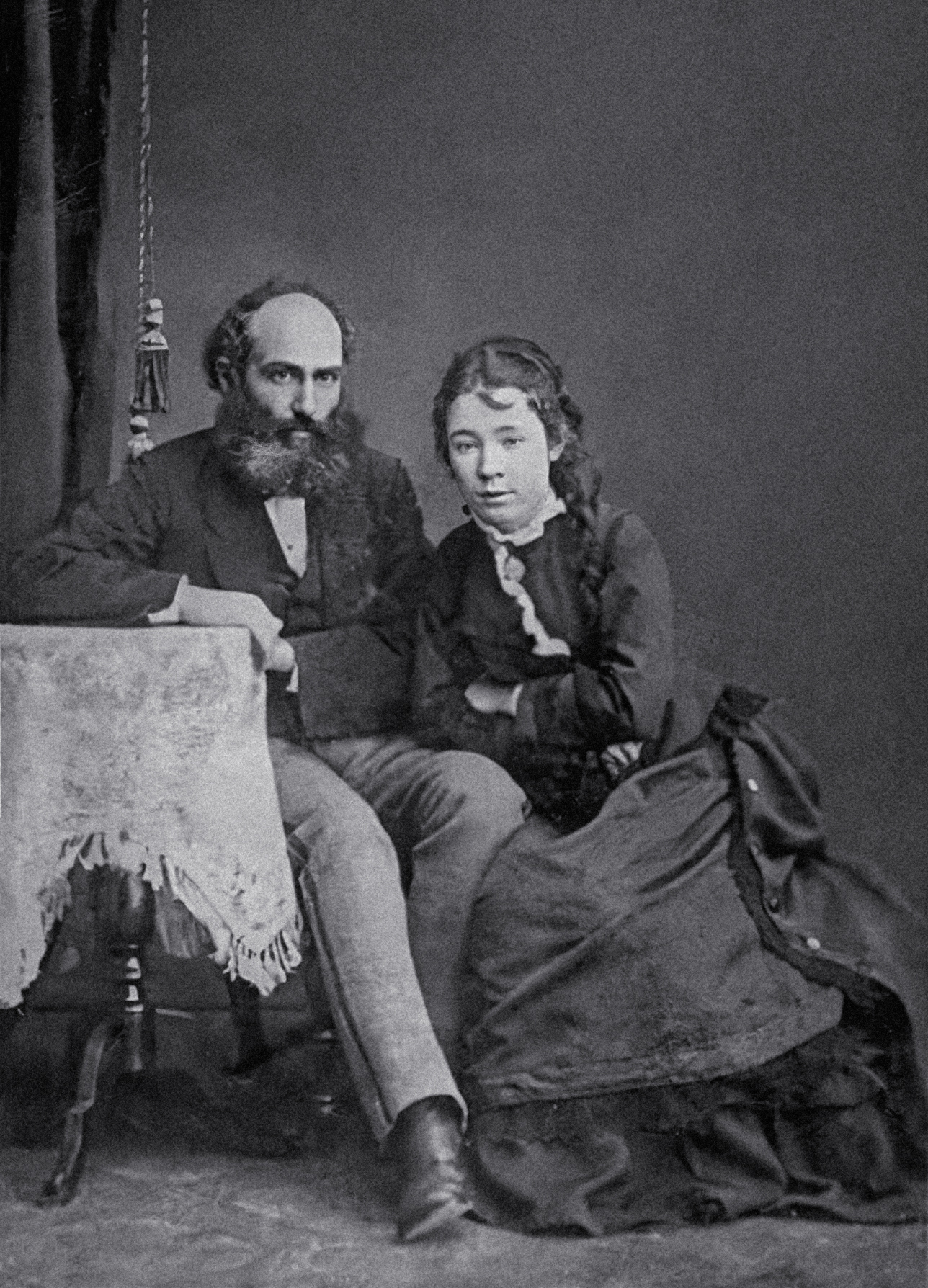
- Hanifa Malikova and her husband, Hasan bey Zardabi
- Born: May 5, 1856; Nalchik, Russian Empire
- Died: May 2, 1929 (aged 72); Baku, Azerbaijan Soviet Socialist Republic, USSR
- Occupation: educator
- Spouse: Hasan bey Zardabi

Hanifa Malikova (née Abaeva; Azerbaijani: Hənifə Məlikova, née Abayeva; May 5, 1856 – May 2, 1929) was one of the first Muslim women in the Caucasus to receive secular education. She later married Hasan bey Zardabi, Azerbaijani journalist and intellectual, and actively participated in the publication of the first Azerbaijani language newspaper Akinchi alongside him between 1875 and 1877. Hanifa was also one of the first female educators in Azerbaijan; she worked at the Russian-Muslim girls' school in Baku and became the first principal of the Empress Alexandra Russian Muslim Boarding School for Girls.

== Biography ==
Hanifa Abaeva was born on May 5, 1856, in Nalchik, in the North Caucasus. Her ethnicity was Balkar and she was the daughter of Aslanbeg Abaev, an officer of Imperial army. She received her education at the St. Nina School from 1862 to 1872. At that time, it was a rare for Muslim girls to receive education in a Christian country.

In 1872, "Kafkaz" newspaper published a list of girls who graduated from the St. Nina School, and Abaeva's name was among them. Upon seeing the name of the Muslim woman on the list, an Azerbaijani journalist and intellectual, Hasan bey Zardabi decided to go to Tbilisi to meet her. Hasan bey's first meeting with Hanifa Abaeva left a positive impression on him. Following this acquaintance, they married in Tbilisi and later moved to Baku.

Hanifa Malikova, while in Baku, opens a school in her home and begins teaching girls. In 1973, there were 12 girls studying at this school. She also actively participated in the publication of the Akinchi newspaper, alongside Hasan bey Zerdabi between 1875 and 1877. In 1877, the "Akinchi" newspaper was banned, and in the same year, Hanifa Melikova's school was also closed. When the open persecution of the Melikov couple began, they moved to Zardab, Hasan bey's hometown.

While they were in Zardab, Malikova devoted herself to teaching women in her community sewing and knitting, as well as literacy skills. Additionally, she nurtured children, established women's advisory centers in various villages, and successfully saved 132 individuals from lifelong blindness within the Zardab community. In 1881, Hanifa Melikova and Hasan bey Zardabi established a free school in their home in Zardab where they provided education and knowledge to people. At that time, the Melikov family was enduring harassment and persecution from local religious authorities and Armenian merchants residing in Zardab. For 16 years, Hanifa Məlikova and her husband lived under police surveillance in Zardab.

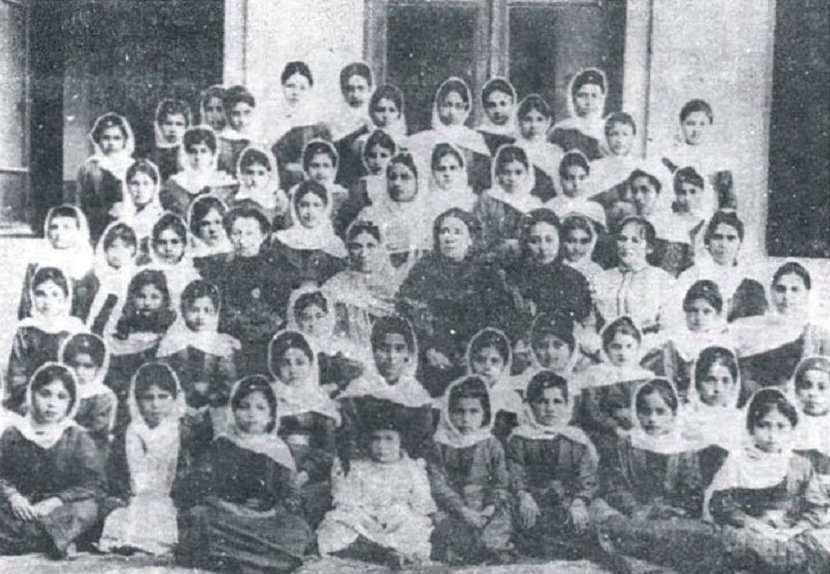
The principal of the Empress Alexandra Russian Muslim School for Girls, Hanifa Malikova among the students.

Hasan bek and Hanifa returned to Baku in 1896. Hanifa Malikova's first students themselves became teachers: if at the beginning of her pedagogical career she had 12 students, then by 1914 Hanifa and her former students were teaching over 2000 girls in Azerbaijan. According to various sources, she worked at the Russian-Muslim girls' school in Baku and became the first principal of the Empress Alexandra Russian Muslim Boarding School for Girls at different years. Malikova attended the Congress of Russian Muslim Teachers in 1906, and her speech from that congress is still preserved.

In addition to her teaching activities, Hanifa Malikova was also involved in social work. She led various charitable organizations and leaded to the movement for removing veil in Azerbaijan. In 1908, she established the first women's charity organization in Baku as a branch of the "Nijat" society. The organization's president was Liza Tuqanova, the wife of Murtuza Mukhtarov.

Between 1920 and 1926, Hanifa worked at the Azerbaijan SSR People's Commissariat of Education.

Hanifa Malikova died on May 2, 1929. She was initially buried in the city cemetery, but later her body was transferred next to the grave of her husband, Hasan bey Zardabi, in the Alley of Honor.

=== Family ===
Hanifa Malikova and Hasan bey Zardabi had two sons and two daughters. Their eldest daughter, Pari Malikova, became the wife of the first parliamentary speaker of the ADR, Alimardan bey Topchubashov. The grave of Malikova's other daughter, Garibsoltan Malikova, was later discovered. Their eldest son, Midhat Malikov, received advanced engineering education in Germany. He was shot in 1937. Their second son, Safvet Malikzadeh, was initially reported missing and later found to be living in Ankara.
