= Muhammad Hassan Bey Veliyev-Baharly =

Azerbaijani scientist

Muhammad Hassan Bey Veliyev- Baharly
- Born: 1896; Shusha, Azerbaijan
- Died: June 27, 1937 (aged 40–41); Baku, Azerbaijan
- Known for: Prominent Azerbaijani ethnographer
- Notable work: Azerbaijan: an overview of geography, nature, ethnography and economy

Muhammad Hassan Bey Veliyev-Baharly (1896 – 27 June 1937) was a prominent Azerbaijani scientist, whose contributions in the studying field of ethnogenesis economy are not only widely used by modern-day scholars but also represent the achievements of the independent Azerbaijan Democratic Republic. Baharly was the first chief of the Azerbaijani State Bank and a professor of Baku State University. He died as a result of political repressions orchestrated by Josef Stalin.

== Life ==
Muhammad Hasan bey Najafgulu bey oglu was born in 1896 in the city of Susha in the region of Nagorno-Karabakh. First Baharly studied in the Gymnasium of Baku, and received higher education at the University of Kyiv at the faculty of economic geography. As a graduate of Kyiv University, he became a professor at Baku State University, which was established during a short period of independence in 1919. Baharly also became a chief in Baku State Bank. After the establishment of Soviet authority in Azerbaijan, Baharly assumed membership in the State Planning Committee.

Between 1923 and 1929, Baharly was a member of Azerbaijani Assembly of Science and Propaganda. Until 1937 he served as secretary in a secret movement for bringing liberation to the country in Azerbaijani National Organization. Until 1926, Baharly was kept as a prisoner of conscience in the Solovki prison camp. He was arrested for the second time in 1937.

Baharly was executed on 27 July 1937.

== Legacy ==
The professor Zakir Mamedov, the member of Azerbaijan National Academy of Sciences, the Doctor of Philosophy, published the series of 17 articles dedicated to the review of compositions by M. Baharly. On Zakir Mamedov's initiative, in the Institute of Philosophy and Politico-legal Studies near Azerbaijan National Academy of Sciences, a special event was organized. During this event, prominent Azerbaijani professors: Suleyman Aliyarli, writer-journalist Muhammed Baharly, Malek Akberzade (Baharly) had a speech in commemoration of M.Baharly.

In 1920, Baharly finished his work "Azerbaijan: An Overview of Geography, Nature, Ethnography, and Economy," in which, for the first time in the history of Azerbaijani science, the problem of ethnogenesis was discussed separately. Besides profound information on ethnicities and the role of each of them in the ethnogenesis of local people, M. Baharly provided information on the migration of Turkic tribes in the territory of the modern-day Azerbaijani Republic. The work was published under the Soviet regime but was started and finished in the Azerbaijan Democratic Republic, so it's referred to as the product of independent Azerbaijan. the 110th anniversary, Orkhan Zakiroglu (Baharly) published an article in "Xalq newspaper".

== Bibliography ==
- "Azərbaycan: Coğrafi-təbii, etnoqrafik və iqtisadi mülahizat". Bakı, 1921; təkrar nəşr: Bakı 1993
