= Akinchi =

Azerbaijani-language newspaper (1875–1877)

Əkinçi (Akinchi)
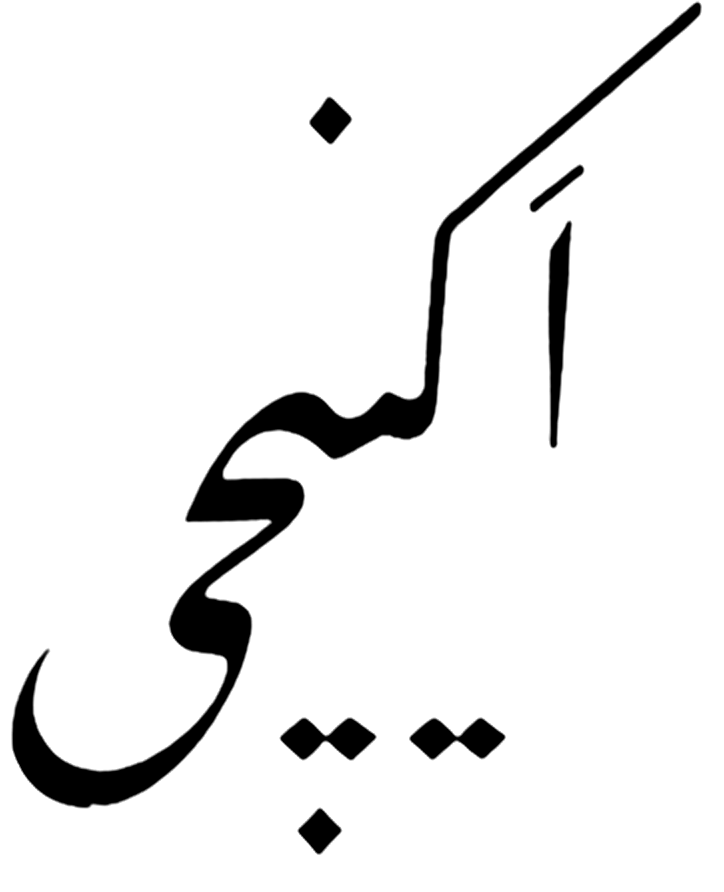

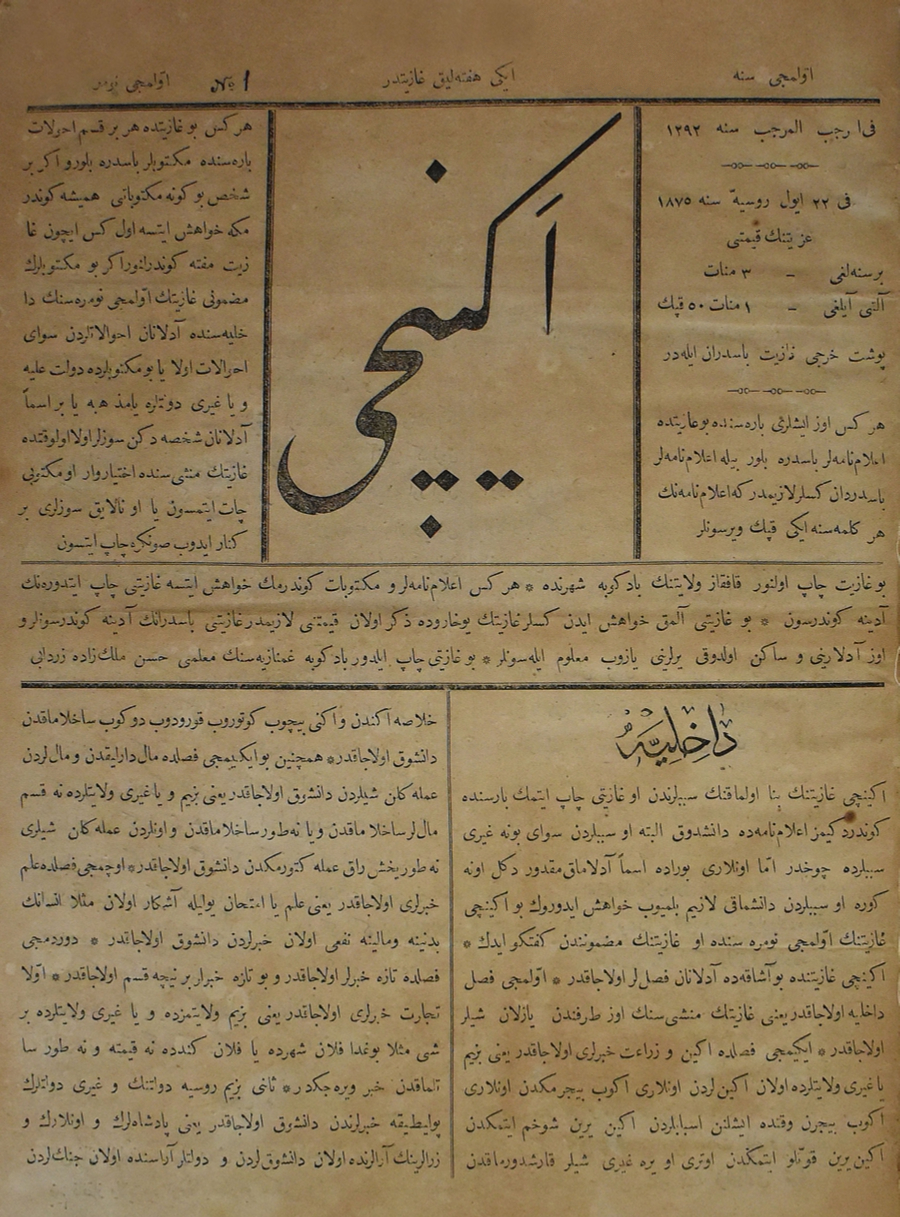
- Front page of Akinchi, 1875, No. 1
- Type: Weekly
- Owner: Hasan bey Zardabi
- Editor-in-chief: Hasan bey Zardabi
- Founded: 22 July 1875; 151 years ago
- Ceased publication: 29 September 1877
- Language: Azerbaijani
- Headquarters: Baku, Russian Empire
- Circulation: 300-400 (1875)

Akinchi (Azerbaijani: Əkinçi, اکينچی), also transliterated as Ekinchi ("The Cultivator"), was the first Azerbaijani-language newspaper, published in Baku (then part of the Russian Empire, now the capital of the Republic of Azerbaijan) between 1875 and 1877. It was the first newspaper fully printed in Azerbaijani, as well as the first private newspaper in Russia printed in a Turkic language.

== History ==
Founded by a journalist, teacher, and scientist, and a Moscow University alumnus Hasan bey Zardabi, Akinchi was regarded almost as revolutionary not only as the first periodical published in Azeri, but for being also the means of reaching the masses. In order to make media accessible to lower classes, Zardabi propagated reforms in the literal Azeri language aimed at making it more vernacular by excluding bulky expressions and loanwords from Persian and Arabic used mostly in religious texts and classical poetry. Akinchi hence would often be subject to criticism by the literati who found its written style too colloquial. In fact, it was deliberately chosen to be written and published using simple, colloquial language so the lower, mainly uneducated (back then) masses would find it easier to grasp the main idea behind all those satirical poems and articles

The Russian governor of the Caucasus, Dmitry Staroselsky, sympathized with Zardabi's endeavours and supported him in the establishment of Akinchi. He was also the one proposing the name for the newspaper that in his opinion would convince the authorities that Akinchi was a non-political magazine that dealt with spreading agricultural technique. In addition to agriculture-oriented articles, Zardabi published materials related to medicine and biology as well as editorials dealing with the social and cultural state of Muslims in the Caucasus. The first issue of Akinchi was printed on 22 July 1875.

Staroselsky's departure was a factor that among others contributed to the shutting down of the periodical on 29 September 1877. Other reasons were lack of sponsorship and low number of readers (who would often be misled by the reactionist clergy into believing in the "sinful nature" of non-religious texts) despite the fact that the newspaper was given away for free. For the 26 months that it existed, Akinchi had attracted only 300 constant readers. Nevertheless, its existence profoundly contributed to the development of journalism in Azerbaijan and the establishment of Azeri-language newspapers and magazines such as Ziya (in 1879), Ziya Gafgaziya (in 1880), Keshkul (in 1883), Sharg-i rus (in 1903), Irshad, Hayat (both in 1905), Fiyuzat, Takammul and Molla Nasraddin (all in 1906) after which the Azeri press entered a new stage of development.

22 July, the day of the first publication of Akinchi, was declared in 2010 as the National Press Day in Azerbaijan.

== Importance and impact ==
The establishment of Akinchi was important for several reasons. To start with, with the release of Akinchi, people started to regard press as a means of mass media, basis for educational reforms, and as an instrument with which social and public conscience was formed. Hasan Bey Zardabi said in the first issue of the journal that a newspaper should mirror the reality of the place it represents and should reflect the needs and wants of the people of the given territory. Another important factor and effect Akinchi has caused was that the journalism system and the generation of journalists appeared for the first time. Professional principles also started to appear for the first time. An official use of the Azerbaijani language became the basis for the functioning of the journal. Akinchi also helped a lot in terms of getting educated people together and of paving the way for the next educated and thinker generations to come.
