= Hasan bey Zardabi =

19th-century Azerbaijani journalist and intellectual

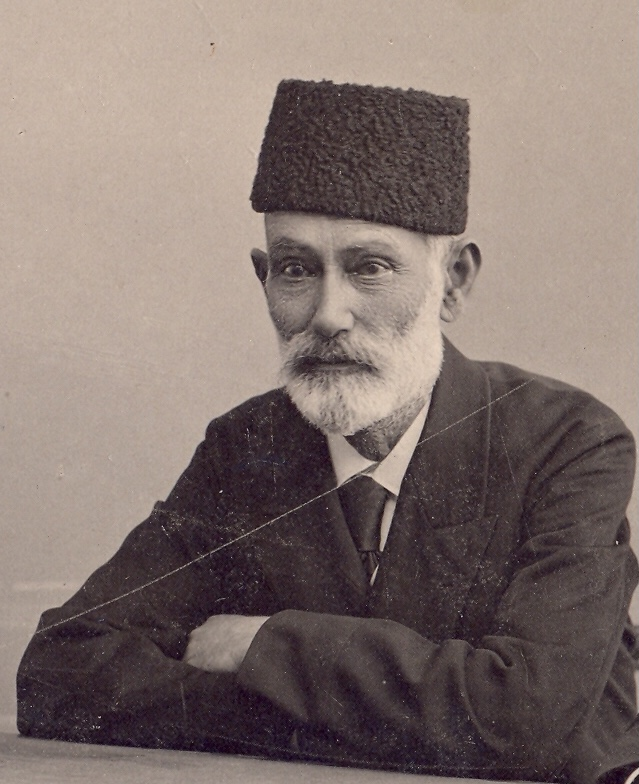
- Born: June 28, 1842; Zardab, Geokchay uezd, Baku Governorate, Russian Empire
- Died: November 28, 1907 (aged 65); Baku, Baku uezd, Baku Governorate, Russian Empire
- Education: Moscow State University
- Occupation: Journalist
- Years active: 1875–1906
- Relatives: Melik Rahim Bey (grandfather)

Hasan bey Zardabi (Azerbaijani: Həsən bəy Zərdabi [hæsænˈbæj zæɾdɑˈbi]), born Hasan bey Salim bey oghlu Malikov (Azerbaijani: Həsən bəy Səlim bəy oğlu Məlikov [hæsænˈbæj sælimˈbæj oːˈlu ˈmælikof]; 28 June 1842 – 15 November 1907), was an Azerbaijani journalist and intellectual, founder of the first Azerbaijani language newspaper Akinchi ("The Ploughman") in 1875.

== Early life ==
Zardabi was born in Zardab, then a small village on the Kura River to the west of Baku. He studied in the Russian school in the city of Shamakhi and later (after receiving a government scholarship) in Tiflis before being admitted to the department of mathematics and physics at Moscow University in the 1860s (his relative Lieutenant general Faraj bey Aghayev helped him get an education). Upon graduating he was appointed administrator in the Land Survey Administration in Tiflis and afterwards in the judiciary in Guba. He quit that position to become a science teacher at a secondary school in Baku, where he established a benevolent society to help raise money to make it possible for children of Muslim parents to receive modern education at Russo-Muslim schools.

== Contributions ==
Throughout his life, Zardabi fought for the enlightenment of Muslims in the Caucasus. Zardabi was a proponent of secularism and education among Muslim population in the South Caucasus.

Initially, he supported the Russian rule but later re-evaluated his estimation of Russia and the benefits of imperial rule. The emerging Azerbaijani intelligentsia regarded Russia as a channel to the European Enlightenment, criticized Islamic practices, and promoted the use of Azerbaijani as a vehicle of local cultural expression. In their struggle for change and transformation, as Audrey Altstadt explains, the Azerbaijani intelligentsia grew to understand that it need not, indeed could not, reject its own cultural heritage. Zardabi came to such a conclusion as a result of his long years in exile in the small village of Zardab.

In 1873 Zardabi with another intelligentsia activist Najaf bey Vazirov staged the first Azerbaijani theatrical production based on the play by Mirza Fatali Akhundov, The Adventure of a Miser. According to Zardabi, theatre was not merely a form of entertainment but a powerful educational tool used to improve public morality, criticize ignorance, and convey social lessons. By collaborating with young intellectuals such as Najaf Bey Vezirov, he contributed to the staging of European-style plays.

In 1875, he founded Akinchi, the first independent newspaper to appear in Azerbaijani language in the Russian Empire. Naming itself as Akinchi (ploughman), this paper addressed itself primarily to the peasant reader in accordance with Zardabi's Narodnik(Populist) ideas, that was dominant in universities of Russia in that era. The preferred language of expression among literate people was Persian and they reacted with hostility to using "unprintable idiom of common folk" (Azeri). The circle of its contributors consisted mainly of Sunnis like Zardabi, whose innuendos that Persia was a backward and inhuman country provoked widespread indignation. This newspaper was shut down several times by the Russian authorities as "harmful and politically unreliable". "In Azerbaijan in the fall of 1877 the police were busy arresting a large number of educated "Tatars" (Russian administration referred to Azeris as "Tatars") for such activities as forming circles and distributing anti-government propaganda." During the 1877–1878 Ottoman–Russian War, the Russian authorities accused Zardabi of supporting the Ottoman side, which played a role in the closure of the newspaper. After the closure of Akinchi in 1877 Zardabi was exiled to his native village.

Zardabi argued that traditional mekteb and madrasa institutions had become outdated and supported educational modernization through the Usul-i Jadid movement. He considered learning Russian essential for Muslims to access modern professions, while emphasizing that this should not serve policies of “Russification.” In 1887, together with H. Mahmudbeyov, he established the first Russian Azerbaijani school in Baku, a model later adopted in cities such as Ganja, Shusha, and Nakhchivan. He also advocated for the education of Muslim girls and collaborated with philanthropists such as H.Z. Taghiyev to promote this cause.

Zardabi served as a member of the Baku City Duma, where he promoted public rights and contributed to projects for the city’s social and cultural development. He also participated, together with H.Z. Taghiyev and M. Mukhtarov, in the establishment and administration of educational and charitable societies, including Nashri-Maarif.

In 1905, however, he resumed his cultural activities by becoming a reporter for the progressive Hayat newspaper. In his articles, he called upon cultural unification of Muslims in Russia and the establishment of a unified Turkic language that will ensure progress and social development by helping Muslims move away from the tradition of writing in Persian and Arabic which, in Zardabi's view, were used by the power-hungry Muslim clergy to spread reactionism and conservatism.

Zardabi died in 1907 in his hometown. Today he is regarded as one of the founders of modern Azerbaijani journalism and theatre. Ganja State University was named after Hasan Bey Zardabi.
