= Sadarin mahal =

Sadarin mahal (also known as Sardanrud mahal; Azerbaijani: Sədənrud mahalı; Russian: Садаринский магал) was one of the administrative districts (mahals) of the Khanate of Shirvan, a semi-autonomous khanate in the South Caucasus. The mahal occupied a fertile lowland region corresponding today to parts of the Ucar, Goychay, Sabirabad, Kurdamir, and Aghdash districts of the Republic of Azerbaijan. Its name was taken from the Sadarin Plain, a lowland bounding the plateau between Shemakha and Lenkoran to the south and west.

== History ==
It was attested in Nusretname as a sanjak of Sâde-rû (Ottoman Turkish: ساده‌رو) which was given to Mustafaoğlu Ömer bey by Özdemiroğlu Osman Pasha in 1578. It was part of Ottoman Shirvan until Treaty of Nasuh Pasha in 1612. It became a part of Safavid Shirvan and later that of the Khanate.

It was briefly part of Shaki Khanate from 1767 to 1768, when forces of Muhammad Husayn Khan Mushtaq captured it with alliance of Fath Ali Khan of Quba. The mahal was granted to Manaf Zarnava'i, son of Hajji Mohammad Ali Khan.

Soon Manaf Zarnava'i planned takeover of the rest of Shirvan Khanate for Shaki, however according to a Russian consular official in Baku, Ivan Matveev, as noted in a document dated 11 September 1768, plan ultimately failed. Shaki faction did not receive sufficient support among Shirvanese nobles, once it became clear that the plan involved installing Shaki's absolute rule in Shamakhi, without the involvement of local feudal elites. The Quba authorities, informed in advance by their supporters, acted preemptively. Fath Ali Khan arrived near New Shamakhi on 17 August 1768, encamping 2 km from the city. He then entered with 2,000 troops, captured Manaf bey along with three prominent elders, and sent them to Derbent. Fath Ali Khan annexed Sardarin and Hassan mahals that was given to Shaki earlier.

By 1792, Sadarin was ruled by `Omar Soltan, who alongside naib of Howz mahal, Yuzbashi bey invited Mostafa Khan to dethrone Qasim Khan. Unable to stand, Qasim escaped to Quba through Qabala. `Omar Soltan was later killed by Mir-Hasan Khan in 1809 while on a diplomatic mission. He was succeeded by his son Hajji Abdollah.

== Administration ==
The mahal was headed by a beg who supervised revenue collection on behalf of the khan, retaining a portion of the proceeds as his salary. At the time of the 1820 Russian survey, the beg of the Sedenrud Mahal was Hajji Ahmad Sultan, son of Baghir beg. The mahal's naib (deputy governor) was Haji Abdollah, son of `Omar Soltan, representing the formal political authority of House of Sarkar.

The position of beg was held by a family with exceptionally close ties to the Shirvan ruling dynasty. Baghir beg was the brother of Bibikhanum Khanum (d. 1807) — the mother of Mostafa Khan of Shirvan and first wife of Aghasi Khan. Baghir beg's son Hajji Ahmad Sultan was the beg of Sadarin. When Mostafa Khan fled to Qajar Iran in September 1820 following the Russian annexation of Shirvan, Ahmad Sultan did not follow him. Russian documents record that he feigned illness to avoid participation in the khan's councils, secretly provided intelligence to Captain Prince Makaev, and even before the khan's flight presented his two sons to the Russian commander as a demonstration of loyalty. Khadija Khanum, the khan's own sister, was subsequently placed under Ahmad Sultan's guardianship by the Russian administration. His villages were not confiscated, unlike those of his brother Qasem Beg. Qasem, having married Khadija Khanum (1776−1852), a sister of Mostafa Khan, chose loyalty to the khan and fled to Iran in 1820 with his son Bala Sultan. He died in 1838 and was buried at the Yeddi Gumbaz Mausoleum in Shamakhi. Khadija Khanum, who initially attempted to flee but was turned back by a Cossack patrol, remained in Shirvan under her cousin Ahmad Sultan's guardianship; she died in 1852 and was buried at the same complex. Their children included Abdurrahman Sultan (1808−1855), who married Mostafa Khan's daughter Masuma Khanum; Murad beg (b. 1820); Zinet begüm (b. 1814), who married Mostafa Khan's son Jafar Qoli Khan; and Shirin begüm (b. 1817), who married Mostafa Khan's son Agha Khan.

== Geography ==
The mahal's settlements spread across the Kura River lowlands. The 1820 Russian survey catalogued 46 localities including villages and nomadic encampments. Villages paying tribute to the treasury included: Bargüşad (Bərgüşad), Qaracallı, Şıxəmir, Hacalı, Şəkili, Yalman, Dulusçu çarxı, Yenikənd, Qazyan, Bığır, Çiyni, Çaxırlı, Əlikənd, Şıxbəy, Mollahacılı, Qaraxıdır, Danabasan-Türkədi, Məlikkənd and Alpı, Kəlbənd, Leki (Lak), Çərəkə, Bəydövül, Kürdşaban, Alxasava, Qüləbənd, Çayarxı, Pirkənd, and Küçeçedy.

Villages belonging to the beg, thus paying no treasury dues were Keşxurd (an Armenian village whose 25 families had immigrated from Karabagh), Şəkər, Alpout, Ərəb, Şıxnəsir.

Nomadic encampments included: Bağırbəyli, Müsüslü, Cəyirli, Şıxlılar (Qubadlı Şıxlı, Mallı Şıxlı and Ulaşlı Şıxlı), Türkman, and Qarabucaq. Of these, Bağırbəyli, Müsüslü, Cəyirli, and Şıxlılar belonged to the beg. The Qarabucaq settlement of 74 families had emigrated from Karabagh and all returned there by 1822. The Türkman and Kürd nomadic encampments owed annual taxes of 250 and 120 local rubles respectively.

== Demographics ==
The 1820 Russian survey recorded 813 tax-paying families and 396 tax-exempt families, for a combined total of approximately 1,209 families. The mahal comprised both settled Azerbaijani (then called Tatar) villages and nomadic tribal encampments, with one Armenian village (Keşxurd). Tax-exempt families included ranjbars (bonded agricultural laborers), nokars (retainers), mullahs, yüzbaşis (military officers), and orphans.

The Sadarin Mahal had the second largest population among Shirvan's mahals, after the Khanchoban mahal.

== Economy ==
The Sadarin mahal was one of the most economically productive districts of the Khanate of Shirvan, distinguished especially by silk production and rice cultivation.

Silk was the mahal's most valuable commodity. Russian authorities noted explicitly that the mahal "produces silk in abundance", and that the begs had not managed to collect all outstanding silk dues before their flight — requiring special attention from the Russian commandant. Many villages maintained dedicated silk farms worked by ranjbars. The village of Alxasava alone hosted an extensive silk operation: Pakhay Begum (one of Mostafa Khan's wives and daughter of Surkhay II) had employed 92 families across 83 silk farms producing tens of batmans of raw silk annually, plus a large vineyard leased for 500 rubles a year. The 1828 register of Qasem Beg's confiscated villages recorded 70 silk orchards producing 23 batmans and 36 stils of silk annually.

Rice was the second principal crop, cultivated extensively in the water-rich lowland areas. Qarabucaq village alone was required to plant 68 taghars of rice, yielding 680 taghars annually to the khan's household. Grain milling was well established, with mills recorded at Arab (2 mills), Bozavand (half-share), Qazyan (leased for 60 rubles/year), and Şaharxı (leased for 4 taghars/year). Viticulture supplemented income across several villages, including Alxasava (3 orchards leased for 500 rubles), Arab (4 large vineyards), and Şaharxı (4 vineyards yielding 100 rubles/year).

The total revenues recorded for the Sadarin mahal in 1820:

Category	Amount
Annual tribute	567 gold rubles
Taxes in kind	29,834 rubles 86 kopeks (local)
Taxes in cash	370 rubles
Mal-o-jehat	1,347 rubles 45¼ kopeks
Darughegy	1,085 rubles 52¼ kopeks
Total (local currency)	32,670 rubles 73½ kopeks
Total (Russian currency)	~20,419 rubles 20½ kopeks

== Russian annexation and aftermath ==
Following Mostafa Khan's flight to Qajar Iran in September 1820, the Russian imperial administration assumed control of Shirvan. In the Sadarin mahal, Qasem Beg's flight with the khan resulted in the confiscation of his extensive private landholdings — 15 villages by the 1828 count — by the Russian provincial treasury. Ahmad Sultan, by contrast, retained his position and properties through his demonstrated loyalty to Russia, and served as guardian for the khan's sister Khadija Khanum. A decade after annexation, revenues from the mahal had slightly increased under Russian administration, consistent with the broader pattern across Shirvan.

== Sources ==
- Bakikhanov, Abbasgulu agha; Floor, Willem M. (2009). The heavenly rose-garden: a history of Shirvan & Daghestan. Washington, DC: Mage Publ. ISBN 978-1-933823-27-0.
- Berzhe, Adolf (1874). Кавказ и Закавказье за время управления генерала от инфантерии Алексея Петровича Ермолова, 1816-1827 [The Caucasus and Transcaucasia during the administration of Infantry General Alexei Petrovich Ermolov, 1816-1827]. Акты, собранные Кавказской археографической комиссией [Acts collected by the Caucasian Archaeographic Commission] (in Russian). Vol. 6–1. Caucasus Viceroyalty.
- Berzhe, Adolf (1873). Кавказ и Закавказье за время управления генерал-лейтенанта маркиза Филиппа Осиповича Паулуччи и генерала от инфантерии Николая Федоровича Ртищева, 1811-1816 [The Caucasus and Transcaucasia during the administration of Lieutenant General Marquis Philip Osipovich Paulucci and General of Infantry Nikolai Fedorovich Rtishchev, 1811-1816]. Акты, собранные Кавказской археографической комиссией [Acts collected by the Caucasian Archaeographic Commission] (in Russian). Vol. 5. Caucasus Viceroyalty.

== See also ==
- Shirvan Khanate
- Mostafa Khan of Shirvan
