= Qarasubasar mahal =

Administrative district of Shirvan Khanate

Qarasubasar mahal (Persian: قره سو بازار محال; Russian: Карасубасарскій магалъ) was an administrative district (mahal) of the Shirvan Khanate, located in what is today the Republic of Azerbaijan's Zardab, Ujar, Aghdash and Kurdamir districts.

== Name ==
The toponym Qarasubasar is of Turkic origin and meant "Valley of Qarasu" which encompassed territories around Qarasu river, a tributary of Kura.

== Administration ==
Under the Khanate of Shirvan, the territory was organized as one of approximately nineteen mahals, each administered through a hierarchy of begs and local officials. The mahal beg supervised tax collection, retaining a portion of the revenue as a salary while the remainder was remitted to the khan's treasury (divan). Following the Russian annexation of Shirvan, revenues were redirected to the imperial treasury, though the administrative structure — including the offices of yüzbaşi (village headman), kadkhoda, and the beg of the mahal was initially preserved.

The 1820 survey of the district provides a comprehensive list of villages, their tax statuses, and the begs responsible for overseeing them. Known supervisors of villages in the mahal included:

- Ibrahim Beg — in charge of the villages of Şilyan and Qarabürk
- Nowruz ʿAli Beg — brother-in-law of Mostafa Khan and in charge of the village of Əlvənd
- Umay Beg — in charge of the villages of Tilan and Köyün (both merged into modern Carlı)
- Melik Rahim Beg — in charge of the village of Çallı and its surrounding silk-producing settlements

The village of Muradxan formerly belonged to Esmaʿil Beg (1760 – 1848), the brother of Mostafa Khan, and passed to the Russian treasury following the khan's flight. Mahal's naib was Melik Rahim Beg, who was a loyalist to Russian Empire during Mostafa Khan's flight to Persia in 1826. He was succeeded by his son Salim Beg c. 1830.

== Geography ==
Qarasubasar Mahal was entirely a settled agricultural district. According to the 1820 survey, it contained no nomadic population, distinguishing it from several other mahals in Shirvan (such as Xançoban, Elat, Qabristan, and Mughan) that were populated wholly or partly by nomads. The mahal was also entirely inhabited by Azerbaijanis (then called Tatars). This made Qarasubasar one of the few mahals in Shirvan that was ethnically and confessionally homogeneous in this respect.

The khan's private family landholdings within the mahal included the villages of Leki 1 (Upper Ləki), Leki 2 (Lower Ləki), and Muradxan. These estates, along with income from associated plows, silk production, and sursat (provisioning dues), were classified as the personal property of Mostafa Khan or had been granted by him to various individuals prior to his flight.

== Villages ==
The following villages are recorded in Register 9 of the 1820 survey:

Village Name (Russian / Modern)	Ethnic Character	Supervising Beg
Şilyan and Qarabürk	Tatar	Ibrahim Beg
Ləki 1	Tatar	Amir Allah Qoli Beg
Ləki 2	Tatar	Aslan Beg
Əlvənd	Tatar	Nowruz ʿAli Beg
Tilan and Köyün	Tatar	Umay Beg
Muradxan	Tatar	Treasury (formerly Esmaʿil Beg)
Xələc	Tatar	Yüzbaşı `Ali-Panah and Mohammad
Zərdab	Tatar	Rahim Beg
Çallı	Tatar (immigrants from Shaki Khanate)	Rahim Beg

The village of Çallı was inhabited entirely by immigrant families who had relocated from the Arash Mahal in the neighboring Shaki Khanate. At the time of the survey, all twenty of its households were classified as tax-exempt, though the Russian administrators noted they would need to be assessed in due course.

== Economy ==
=== Agriculture ===
The primary agricultural products of Qarasubasar Mahal were wheat, barley, cotton, silk, and madder. Silk cultivation was particularly prominent: the mahal contained numerous silk farms, orchards, and silk-processing sheds. Villages such as those supervised by Rahim Beg were described as populated entirely by silk producers, who paid their dues in silk to the begs.

The village of Muradxan was notable for its production of madder, the root of which yields a red dye used in carpet-dyeing. In 1820, Muradxan's inhabitants owed 225 local rubles to Esmaʿil Beg as dues on madder production, plus 150 local rubles in toujih (administrative dues).

In 1820, Qarasubasar Mahal suffered a severe locust infestation. As a result, Mostafa Khan exempted the villages of the mahal from the standard agricultural tax that would otherwise have required them to deliver 63 taghars of wheat, 25 taghars of barley, and 50 batmans of cleaned cotton to the khan's treasury. Russian administrators noted that the total cotton harvest could not be ascertained and instructed the commandant to determine the correct amount and tax it accordingly.

== Taxation and Revenue ==
The 1820 survey recorded the following fiscal totals for Qarasubasar Mahal:

Category	Amount
Tax-paying families	457
Tax-exempt families	360
Annual tribute (pishkesh)	770 gold rubles
Dues in kind	6,669 rubles and 36 kopeks (local currency)
Dues in cash	1,029 rubles (local currency)
Mal-o-jehat (harvest tax)	4,572 rubles (local currency)
Total revenue (local currency)	12,270 rubles
Total revenue (Russian currency)	7,668 rubles and 97½ kopeks

The unusually high number of tax-exempt families (360, compared to 457 tax-paying) reflects the large numbers of household members belonging to exempt categories: widows with small children, sayyids, mullahs, nokars, newly arrived immigrants, and ranjbars (sharecroppers tied to the begs or the khan).

Taxes levied in the mahal followed the standard Shirvan system:

- Sursat — a provisioning due paid in kind (wheat)
- Mal-o-jehat — a tithe on the harvest, paid in agricultural produce (silk, wheat, barley, cotton)
- Darughegy — the salary due to the supervising beg, deducted from mahal revenues
- Annual tribute (pishkesh) — a fixed sum paid in gold rubles per household

A tribute of 154 gold rubles was repeatedly assessed across the larger village groups in the mahal, suggesting a standardized block assessment applied to clusters of households under a single beg's supervision.

Qarasubasar was among the mahals with a significant silk economy. Multiple villages within the mahal maintained silk farms, orchards containing mulberry trees, and sheds for silk production. Revenue from silk formed a substantial part of the mal-o-jehat collected in the mahal. Silk dues were expressed in batmans (a unit of weight), and certain villages paid entirely in silk rather than grain.

For example, the villages under Rahim Beg's administration contained 70 silk farms, and the mal-o-jehat included 18 batmans of silk, valued at 1,260 rubles in local currency. Another group under Umay Beg contributed 10 batmans of silk (700 rubles) as mal-o-jehat.

== Sources ==
- Bournoutian, George A. (2016). The 1820 Russian Survey of the Khanate of Shirvan. Gibb Memorial Trust Series (1st ed.). Havertown: Edinburgh University Press. ISBN 978-1-909724-80-8.
