= Cəyirli =

Cəyirli or Dzheirli or Dzheiyrli or Dzhagirli or Dzhagyrli or Dzheyirli or Dzhayirli or Dzhairli may refer to:

- Cəyirli, Barda, Azerbaijan
- Cəyirli, Gobustan, Azerbaijan
- Cəyirli, Goychay, Azerbaijan
- Cəyirli, Hajigabul, Azerbaijan
- Cəyirli, Shaki, Azerbaijan
- Çayırlı, Azerbaijan
- Çəyirli, Azerbaijan

== See also ==
- Çayırlı (disambiguation)
