= Hacıalılı =

Hacıalılı or Gadzhalyly or Gedzhally may refer to:

- Hacıalılı, Barda, Azerbaijan
- Hacıalılı, Qabala, Azerbaijan
- Hacıalılı, Samukh, Azerbaijan
- Hacıalılı, Tovuz, Azerbaijan
- Hacıalılı, Zangilan, Azerbaijan

== See also ==
- Hacallı (disambiguation)
