= Karabudzhak =

Karabudzhak or Karabudzhakh or Karabudzhag or Karabudshach or Karabujakh may refer to:

- Axtaçı, Kurdamir, Azerbaijan
- Kür Qarabucaq, Azerbaijan
- Qarabucaq

- Qarabucaq (Northern Kurdamir), Azerbaijan
- Qarabucaq (Southern Kurdamir), Azerbaijan
