= Axtaçı =

Axtaçı or Akhtachi or Akhtachy may refer to:

- Axtaçı, Agsu, Azerbaijan
- Axtaçı, Kurdamir, Azerbaijan
- Axtaçı, Sabirabad, Azerbaijan
- Axtaçı Şirvan, Azerbaijan
- Akhtachi, Iran, a village in Hamadan Province, Iran
- Akhtachi Rural District, in West Azerbaijan Province, Iran
- Akhtachi-ye Gharbi Rural District, in West Azerbaijan Province, Iran
- Akhtachi-ye Mahali Rural District, in West Azerbaijan Province, Iran
- Akhtachi-ye Sharqi Rural District, in West Azerbaijan Province, Iran
