= Ovçulu =

Ovçulu may refer to:

- Ovçulu, Agdash, Azerbaijan
- Ovçulu, Shamakhi, Azerbaijan

== See also ==
- Ovcullu, Azerbaijan
