= Hacallı =

Hacallı or Hacıalılı or Hajally or Hacalli may refer to:

- Hacallı, Barda (disambiguation), several places in Azerbaijan
  - İkinci Hacallı, Azerbaijan
- Hacallı, Goranboy, Azerbaijan
- Hacallı, Tartar, Azerbaijan
- Hacallı, Tovuz, Azerbaijan
- Hacallı, Zangilan, Azerbaijan
- Hacalıkənd, Azerbaijan

== See also ==
- Hacıalılı (disambiguation)
