= Türkədi =

Türkədi or Tyurkedi or Tyurkedy may refer to:

- Türkədi, Kurdamir, Azerbaijan
- Türkədi, Sabirabad, Azerbaijan
