= Hapıtlı =

Hapıtlı or Gapytly or Khapytly may refer to:

- Hapıtlı, Agdash, Azerbaijan
- Hapıtlı, Ismailli, Azerbaijan
