= Bığır =

Bığır may refer to:

- Bığır, Goychay, Azerbaijan
- Bığır, Ismailli, Azerbaijan

== See also ==
- Bügür
