= Burunlu =

Burunlu or Bürünlü may refer to:

- Bürünlü, Zangilan, Azerbaijan
- Burunlu, Zardab, Azerbaijan
