= Ərəbşahverdi =

Ərəbşahverdi or Arabshakhverdi or Arabsahverdi may refer to:

- Ərəbşahverdi, Gobustan, Azerbaijan
- Ərəbşahverdi, Goychay, Azerbaijan
