= Karasakhkal =

Karasakhkal may refer to:

- Yukhary Karasakkal, Azerbaijan
- Qarabaqqal, Azerbaijan
