= Gəraybəyli =

Gəraybəyli or Geraybeyli may refer to:

- Gəraybəyli, Ismailli, Azerbaijan
- Gəraybəyli, Ujar, Azerbaijan
