= Siləyli =

Siləyli or Seleyli or Sileyli may refer to:

- Siləyli, Qabala, Azerbaijan
- Siləyli, Zardab, Azerbaijan
