= Pirkənd =

Pirkənd or Pirkend may refer to:

- Pirkənd, Agdash, Azerbaijan
- Pirkənd, Ujar, Azerbaijan
