= Vəlixanlı =

Vəlixanlı or Velikhanly may refer to:

- Vəlixanlı, Yardymli, Azerbaijan
- Vəlixanlı, Zardab, Azerbaijan
