= Ənvər Məmmədxanlı =

Ənvər Məmmədxanlı may refer to:

- Ənvər Məmmədxanlı (writer)
- Ənvər Məmmədxanlı, Azerbaijan
