= Əlikənd =

Əlikənd or Alikend or Alykend or Alikand or Allykend may refer to:

- Əlikənd, Goychay
- Allykend, Kalbajar
- Əlikənd, Ujar
