= Ənvər Məmmədxanlı, Azerbaijan =

Anvar Mammadkhanli
- Municipality
- Azerbaijani: Ənvər Məmmədxanlı
- Location within Azerbaijan
- Coordinates: 40°28′19″N 47°48′01″E
- Country: Azerbaijan
- District: Ujar

Population
  - Total: 237
- Time zone: UTC+4 (AZT)
  - Summer (DST): UTC+5 (AZT)

Ənvər Məmmədxanlı (until 2008, Kirovkend and Anvar Mammadkhanli) is a village and municipality in the Ujar District of Azerbaijan. It has a population of 237. The village was formerly named for Sergei Kirov and in 2008 renamed for writer Anvar Mammadkhanli.
