= Qızılağac =

Qızılağac, Ghizil-Agaj, Kyzylagach, Kyzylagadzh, Kizil’-Agach, Kizyl-Aghach or Kizyl-Agach may refer to the following places in Azerbaijan:

- Qızılağac, Goychay
- Qızılağac, Masally
- Qızılağac, Salyan
- Ghizil-Agaj State Reserve

== See also ==
- Qyzylaghash, Almaty Province, Kazakhstan
