= Malikkand =

Malikkand may refer to:

- Məlikkənd, Azerbaijan
- Malekan, Iran

== See also ==
- Melikkend (disambiguation)
