= Cırkənd =

Cırkənd is a village in the municipality of Bığır in the Goychay Rayon of Azerbaijan.
