= Hüseynxanlı =

- Municipality
- Location within Azerbaijan
- Coordinates: 40°14′N 47°39′E
- Country: Azerbaijan
- Rayon: Zardab

Population
  - Total: 424
- Time zone: UTC+4 (AZT)
  - Summer (DST): UTC+5 (AZT)

Hüseynxanlı (also, Guseynkhanly) is a village and municipality in the Zardab Rayon of Azerbaijan. It has a population of 424.
