= Cilovxanlı =

- Municipality
- Location within Azerbaijan
- Coordinates: 40°19′04″N 47°41′14″E
- Country: Azerbaijan
- Rayon: Zardab

Population
  - Total: 215
- Time zone: UTC+4 (AZT)
  - Summer (DST): UTC+5 (AZT)

Cilovxanlı (also, Cülovxanlı) is a village and municipality in the Zardab Rayon of Azerbaijan. It has a population of 215.
