= Pərvanlı =

- Municipality
- Location within Azerbaijan
- Coordinates: 40°11′30″N 47°34′29″E
- Country: Azerbaijan
- Rayon: Zardab

Population
  - Total: 1,301
- Time zone: UTC+4 (AZT)
  - Summer (DST): UTC+5 (AZT)

Pərvanlı (also, Pervanly) is a village and municipality in the Zardab Rayon of Azerbaijan. It has a population of 1,301.

== See also ==
- Administrative divisions of Azerbaijan
