= Otmanoba =

- Municipality
- Location within Azerbaijan
- Coordinates: 40°05′44″N 47°54′01″E
- Country: Azerbaijan
- Rayon: Zardab

Population
  - Total: 753
- Time zone: UTC+4 (AZT)
  - Summer (DST): UTC+5 (AZT)

Otmanoba (also, Atmanly) is a village and municipality in the Zardab Rayon of Azerbaijan. It has a population of 753.
