= Kəndəbil =

- Municipality
- Location within Azerbaijan
- Coordinates: 40°07′12″N 47°47′45″E
- Country: Azerbaijan
- Rayon: Zardab

Population
  - Total: 786
- Time zone: UTC+4 (AZT)
  - Summer (DST): UTC+5 (AZT)

Kəndəbil (also, Gendabil’ and Gendebil’) is a village and municipality in the Zardab Rayon of Azerbaijan. It has a population of 786.
