= Mamish Abdullayev =

Azerbaijani Red Army sergeant (1923–1945)

Mamish Shabhaz oglu Abdullayev
- Məmiş Şahbaz oğlu Abdullayev
- Born: 1923; Muradxan, TSFSR, Soviet Union
- Died: 26 January 1945 (aged 21–22); East Prussia
- Military career
- Allegiance: Soviet Union
- Branch: Red Army
- Service years: 1943–1945
- Rank: Sergeant
- Unit: 399th Rifle Division
- Conflicts: World War II; Battle of Kursk; Operation Bagration; East Prussian Offensive
- Awards: Hero of the Soviet Union Order of Lenin; Order of the Red Star (2) Medal "For Courage"

Mamish Shahbaz oglu Abdullayev (Azerbaijani: Məmiş Şahbaz oğlu Abdullayev; 1923 – 26 January 1945) was an Azerbaijani Red Army sergeant and a posthumous Hero of the Soviet Union. Abdullayev was posthumously awarded the title on 24 March 1945 for his actions in September 1944 during the capture of the Narew bridgeheads, in which he reportedly killed more than 29 German soldiers. Abdullayev was killed in action four months later.

== Early life ==
Abdullayev was born in 1923 in Muradxan to a peasant family. After graduating from junior high school he worked as an accountant on the kolkhoz.

== World War II ==
Abdullayev was drafted into the Red Army in June 1943. He became a machine gunner in the 1343rd Rifle Regiment of the 399th Rifle Division. He fought in the Battle of Kursk, the Battle of the Dnieper and Operation Bagration. On 6 June 1944 he was awarded the Order of the Red Star for his actions in September and October 1943 during the Battle of the Dnieper. Abdullayev received a second Order of the Red Star on 7 August 1944 and the Medal "For Courage" on 29 July 1944 for his actions during the early phase of Operation Bagration in late June.

During the later phase of Operation Bagration, the division advanced into Poland. During the breakthrough at the village of Rynek-Ostrov on 3 September, Abdullayev reportedly enabled the advance of his company with fire from his machine gun. During the advance, his unit reportedly ran into 60 submachine gun and three machine gun positions. Abdullayev reportedly bypassed the German positions from the left flank and opened fire. The company reportedly attacked as a result of the diversion. During the battle, Abdullayev reportedly killed 29 German soldiers, captured two machine guns, mortars and ten rifles.

On 4 September Abdullayev was reportedly one of the first in his unit to cross the Narew at Dworskie south of Różan. He reportedly covered the crossing of his company with machine gun fire. Abdullayev was wounded while repulsing German counterattacks and his machine gun was disabled. He reportedly used grenades to destroy two firing points and then captured a machine gun, opening fire with it. After recovering from his wound in the hospital Abdullayev returned to his unit. He fought in the East Prussian Offensive and was killed on 26 January 1945. He was buried on the southern outskirts of Furstenau. On 24 March 1945 Abdullayev was posthumously awarded the title Hero of the Soviet Union and the Order of Lenin.
