= Lələağacı =

- Municipality
- Location within Azerbaijan
- Coordinates: 40°11′28″N 47°37′33″E
- Country: Azerbaijan
- Rayon: Zardab

Population
  - Total: 591
- Time zone: UTC+4 (AZT)
  - Summer (DST): UTC+5 (AZT)

Lələağacı (also, Leleagadzhy and Lyalyaagadzhy) is a village and municipality in the Zardab Rayon of Azerbaijan. It has a population of 591.
