= Goychay Pomegranate Festival =

Annual cultural festival held in Goychay, Azerbaijan

Goychay Pomegranate Festival Göyçay nar festivalı
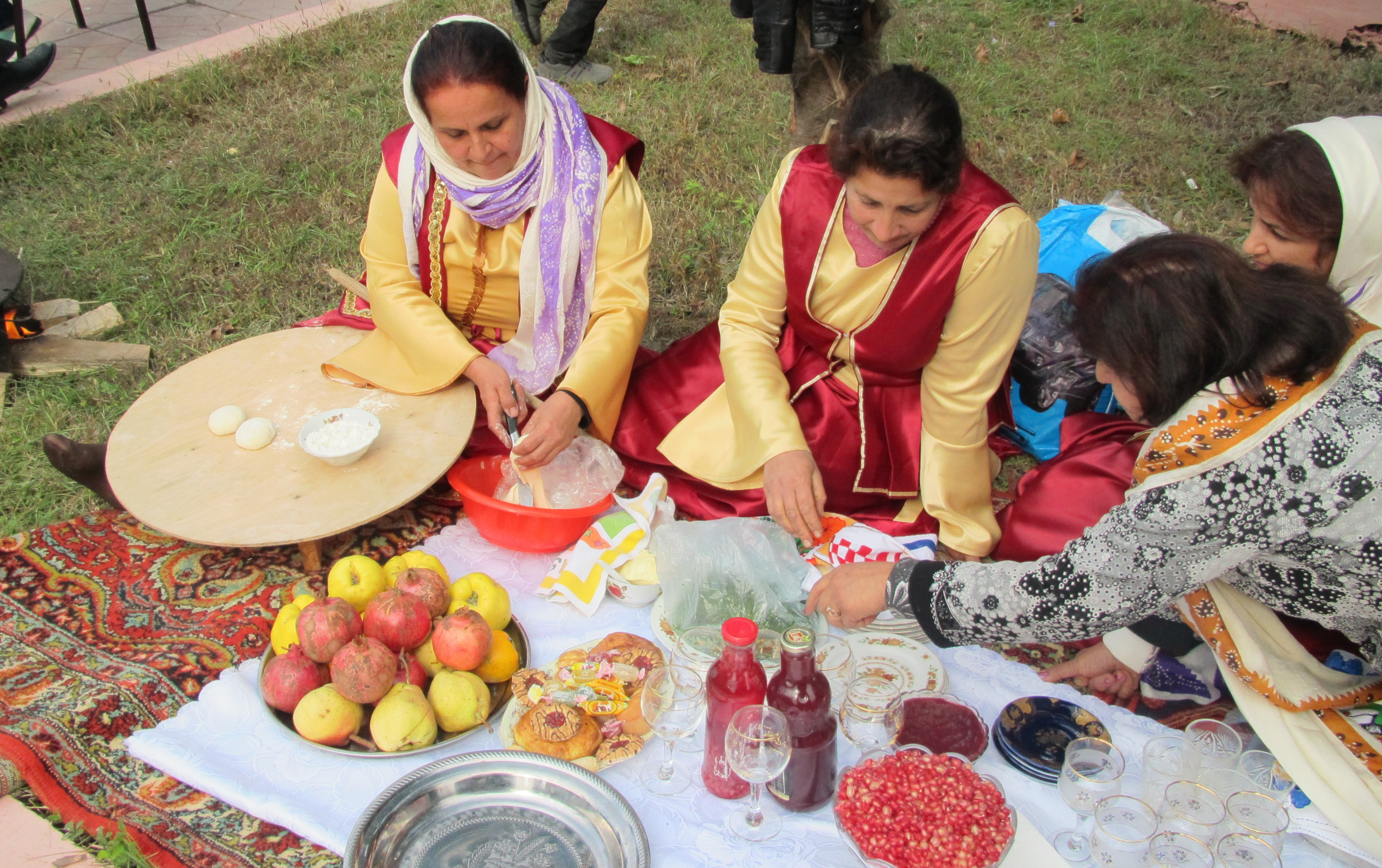
- Celebrators of the festival in 2011
- Status: Active
- Genre: Festival
- Frequency: Annual
- Location: Goychay District
- Country: Azerbaijan

Nar Bayrami, traditional pomegranate festivity and culture
- UNESCO Intangible Cultural Heritage
- Country: Azerbaijan
- Reference: 01511
- Region: Europe and North America

Inscription history
- Inscription: 2020 (15th session)
- List: Representative

The Goychay Pomegranate Festival (Azerbaijani: Göyçay nar festivalı) is an annual cultural festival that is held in Goychay, Azerbaijan. The festival features Azerbaijani fruit-cuisine mainly the pomegranates from Goychay. At the festival, a cultural parade is held with dances and music.

In 2020, the Goychay Pomegranate Festival was inscribed in the Representative List of the Intangible Cultural Heritage of Humanity of UNESCO.

== Concept ==
The festival features a fair and an exhibition that displays different local varieties of pomegranates as well as various pomegranate products produced by local enterprises. During the festival, music and dance performances are presented each year. The festival also includes athletic performances and various craftsmen, potters, millers, blacksmiths, artists, performances of folklore groups and paintings.

== Gallery ==
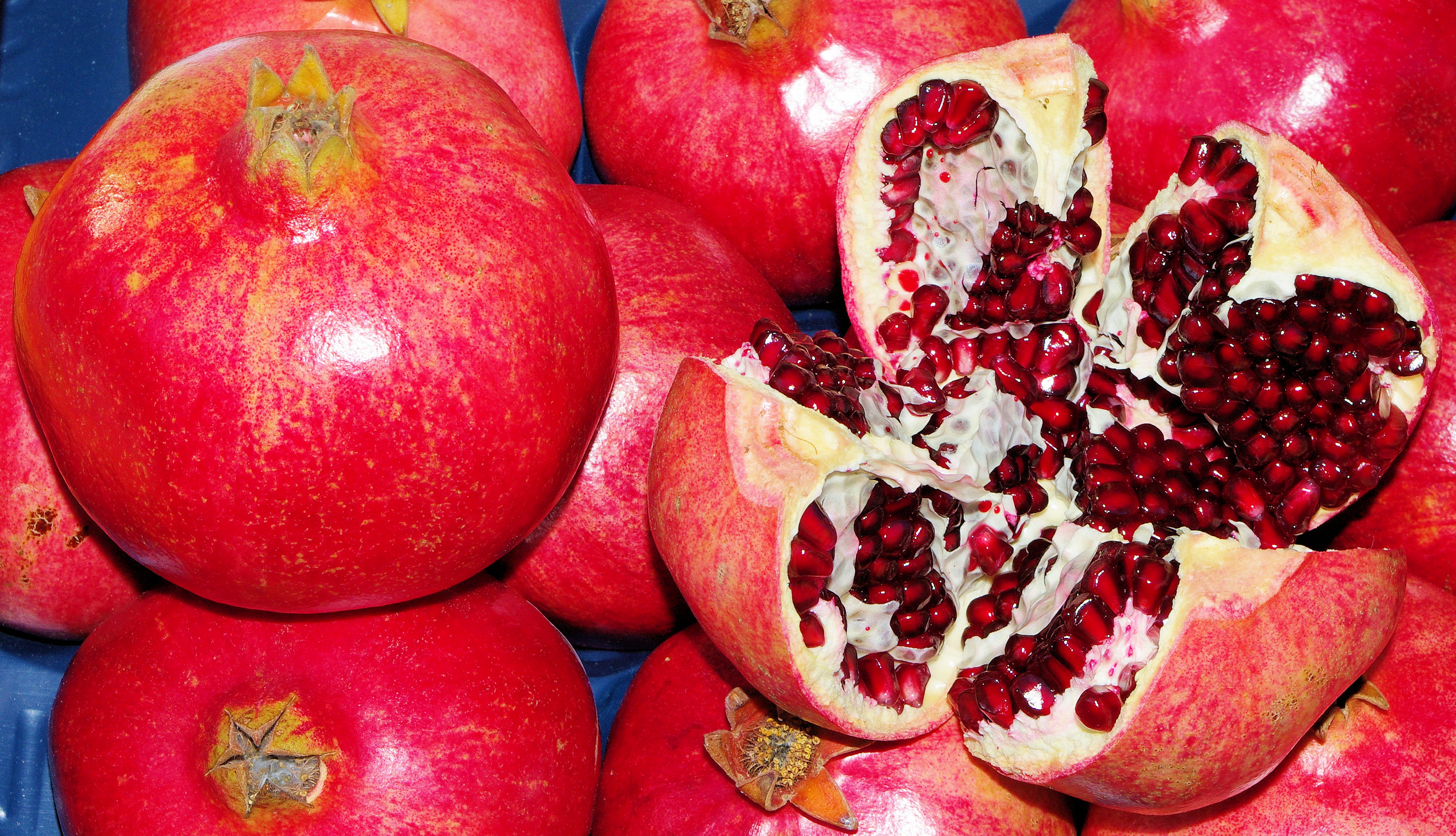
Pomegranate

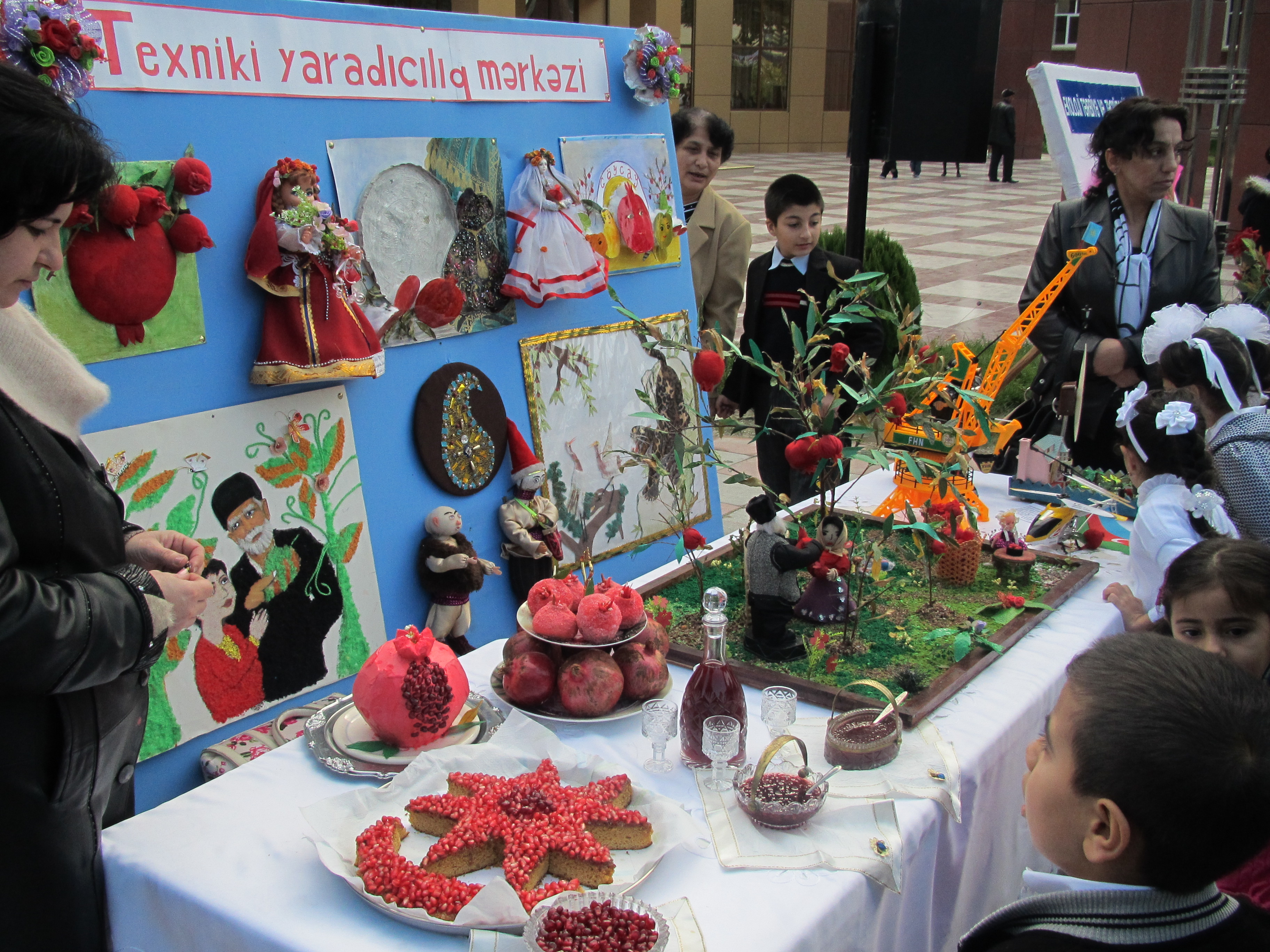
Goychay (city), 2011 year. One of the prepared stands at the Pomegranate Festival.

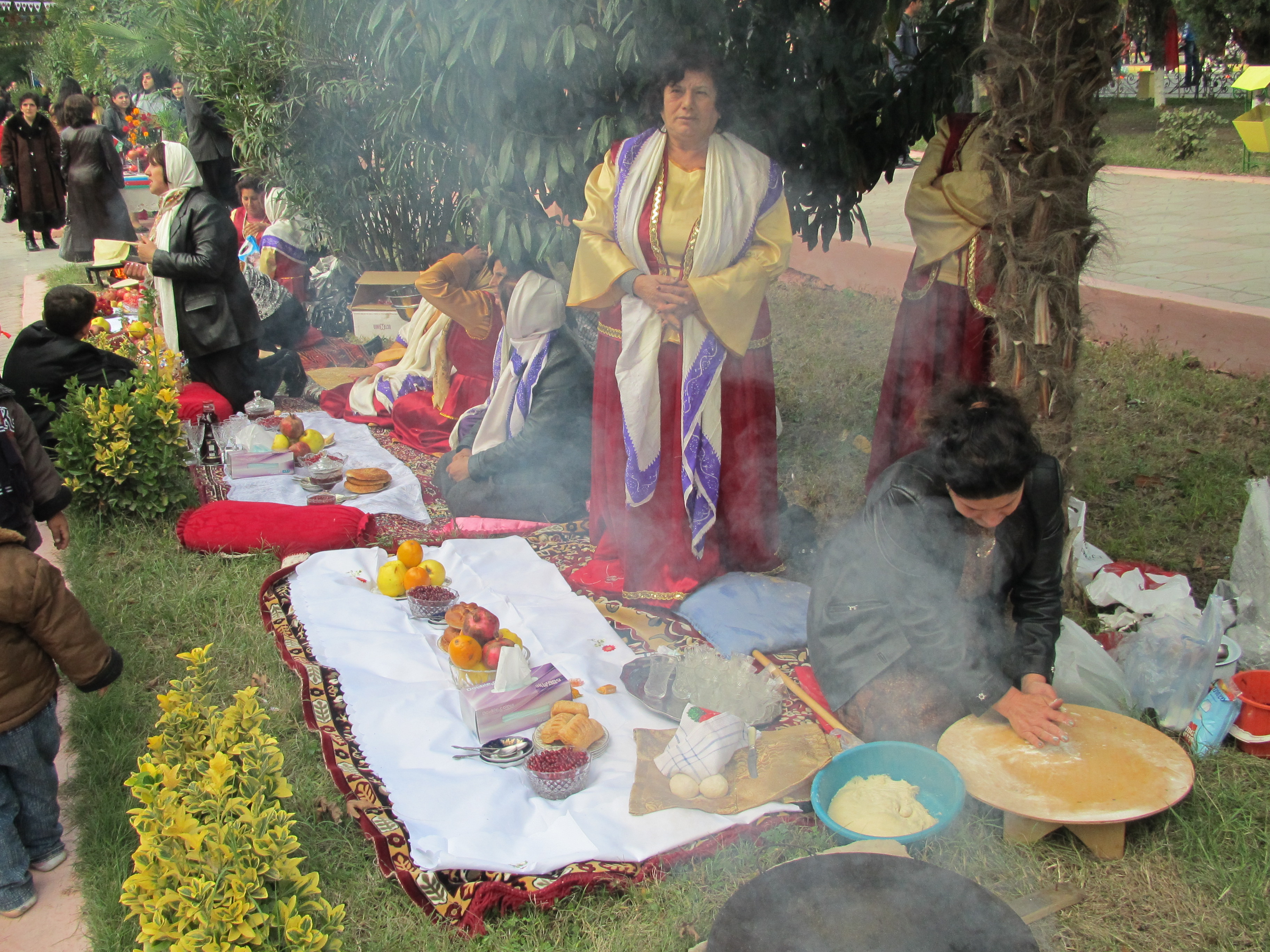
Goychay (city), 2011 year. Women in national costumes are making lavash.

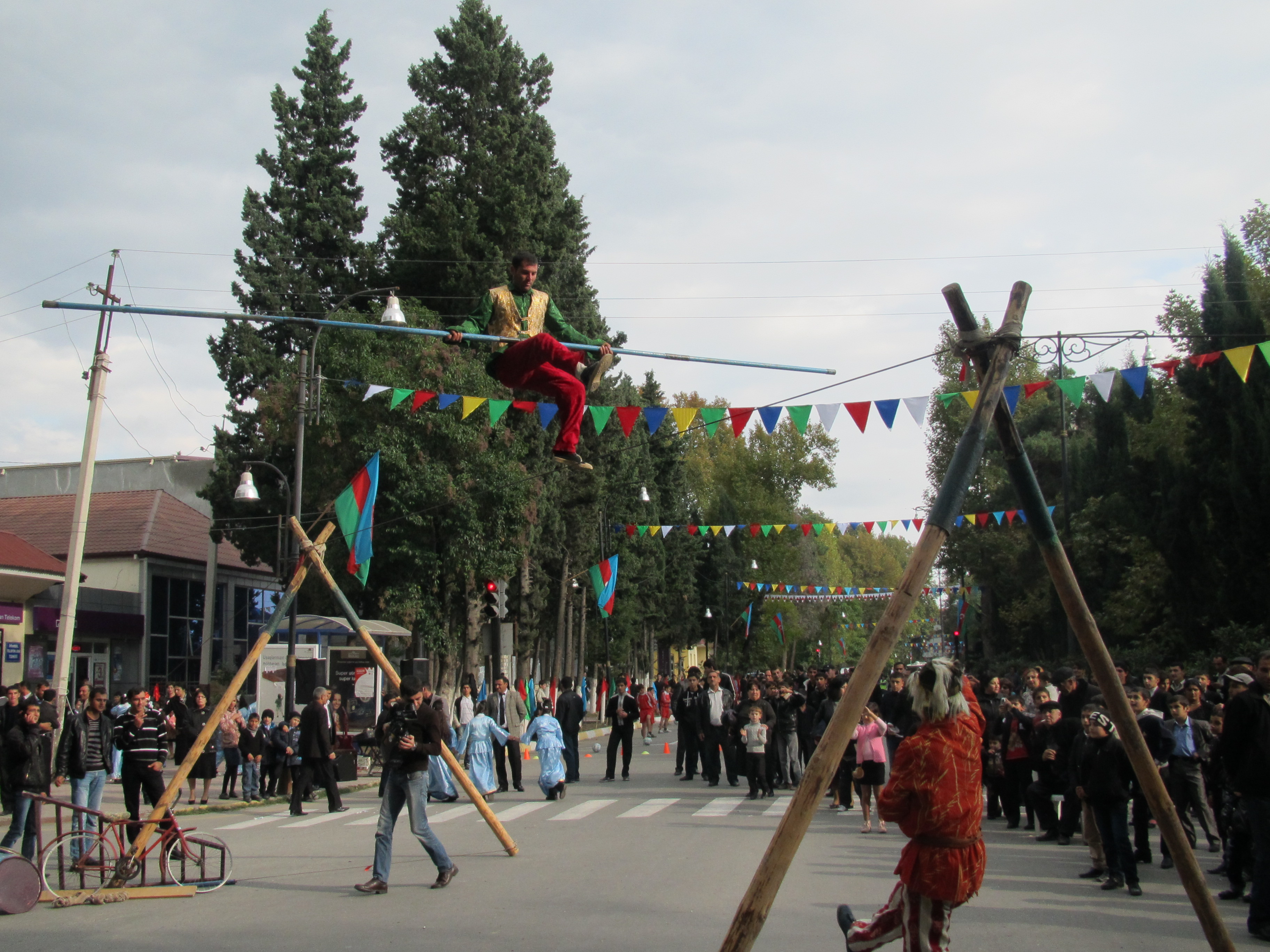
Goychay (city), 2011 year. Acrobat's performance at the Pomegranate Festival.

== See also ==
- Quba Apple Festival
