= Şahlıq =

- Municipality
- Location within Azerbaijan
- Coordinates: 40°28′18″N 47°29′24″E
- Country: Azerbaijan
- Rayon: Ujar

Population
  - Total: 1,038
- Time zone: UTC+4 (AZT)
  - Summer (DST): UTC+5 (AZT)

Şahlıq (also, Shakhlyk) is a village and municipality in the Ujar Rayon of Azerbaijan. It has a population of 1,038.
