= Dövranlı =

Place in Goychay, Azerbaijan

Coordinates: 40°34′N 47°58′E

Dövranlı is a village and municipality in the Goychay Rayon of Azerbaijan. It has a population of 326.
