= Melikkend =

Melikkend may refer to:

- Melikgyugh, Armenia
- Məlikkənd, Azerbaijan

== See also ==
- Malikkand (disambiguation)
