= Dəkkəoba =

- Municipality
- Location within Azerbaijan
- Coordinates: 40°11′57″N 47°44′37″E
- Country: Azerbaijan
- Rayon: Zardab

Population
  - Total: 1,191
- Time zone: UTC+4 (AZT)
  - Summer (DST): UTC+5 (AZT)

Dəkkəoba (also, Bala-Dekkya and Dekkyaoba) is a village and municipality in the Zardab Rayon of Azerbaijan. It has a population of 1,191.
