= Şahhüseynli =

- Municipality
- Location within Azerbaijan
- Coordinates: 40°08′26″N 47°52′18″E
- Country: Azerbaijan
- Rayon: Zardab

Population
  - Total: 1,371
- Time zone: UTC+4 (AZT)
  - Summer (DST): UTC+5 (AZT)

Şahhüseynli (also, Şahhüseynlü, Shakhsunni, Shakhsyunlyu, and Shakhsyunnyu) is a village and municipality in the Zardab Rayon of Azerbaijan. It has a population of 1,371.
