= Müskürlü =

- Municipality
- Location within Azerbaijan
- Coordinates: 40°33′33″N 47°38′18″E
- Country: Azerbaijan
- Rayon: Goychay

Population
  - Total: 1,040
- Time zone: UTC+4 (AZT)
  - Summer (DST): UTC+5 (AZT)

Müskürlü (also, Gyrakh-Myuskyurlyu and Myuskyurli) is a village and municipality in the Goychay Rayon of Azerbaijan. It has a population of 1,040. The municipality consists of the villages of Müskürlü and Qəbələ Müskürlü.
