= İkinci Alxasava =

- Location within Azerbaijan
- Coordinates: 40°34′31″N 47°59′06″E
- Country: Azerbaijan
- Rayon: Goychay
- Time zone: UTC+4 (AZT)
  - Summer (DST): UTC+5 (AZT)

İkinci Alxasava (also, Alkhasava Vtoroye and Ikindzhi-Alkhasova) is a village in the Goychay Rayon of Azerbaijan.
