= Nəzəralılı =

- Municipality
- Location within Azerbaijan
- Coordinates: 40°09′05″N 47°46′42″E
- Country: Azerbaijan
- Rayon: Zardab

Population
  - Total: 204
- Time zone: UTC+4 (AZT)
  - Summer (DST): UTC+5 (AZT)

Nəzəralılı (also, Nazarally) is a village and municipality in the Zardab Rayon of Azerbaijan. It has a population of 204.
