= Çayırlı (disambiguation) =

Çayırlı is a town in Çayırlı District, Erzincan Province, Turkey.

Çayırlı (Turkic: "with meadows") may refer to:

- Çayırlı, Adıyaman, a village in Adıyaman district of Adıyaman Province, Turkey
- Çayırlı, Daday, a village
- Çayırlı, Gölbaşı, a neighborhood of Gölbaşı district of Ankara Province, Turkey
- Çayırlı, Sason, a village in Sason district of Batman Province, Turkey
- Çayırlı, Yenişehir
- Çayırlı, Azerbaijan, a village and municipality in Goychay Rayon, Azerbaijan

== See also ==
- Cəyirli (disambiguation)
