= Aşağı Qaraməryam =

- Municipality
- Location within Azerbaijan
- Coordinates: 40°34′45″N 47°58′56″E
- Country: Azerbaijan
- Rayon: Goychay
- Time zone: UTC+4 (AZT)
  - Summer (DST): UTC+5 (AZT)

Aşağı Qaraməryam (also, Ashagy Karamar’yam and Karamar’yam) is a village and municipality in the Goychay Rayon of Azerbaijan. It has a population of 838.
