= Nəcəfalı =

- Location within Azerbaijan
- Coordinates: 40°16′N 47°39′E
- Country: Azerbaijan
- Rayon: Zardab
- Time zone: UTC+4 (AZT)
  - Summer (DST): UTC+5 (AZT)

Nəcəfalı (also, Nadzhafali) is a former village in the Zardab Rayon of Azerbaijan.
