= Chally =

Chally is an alternate spelling for:

- Çallı, Zardab, a village in Azerbaijan
- Challis (fabric), a type of fabric
- Challenger 1, a British tank in service from the mid-1980s to early 21st century
- Challenger 2, a British tank in service since 1998
