= Gödəkqobu =

- Municipality
- Location within Azerbaijan
- Coordinates: 40°14′38″N 47°35′13″E
- Country: Azerbaijan
- Rayon: Zardab

Population
  - Total: 1,363
- Time zone: UTC+4 (AZT)
  - Summer (DST): UTC+5 (AZT)

Gödəkqobu (also, Gëdakkobu, Gedekkobu, and Gëdyakkobu) is a village and municipality in the Zardab Rayon of Azerbaijan. It has a population of 1,363.
