= Qoşaoba =

- Municipality
- Location within Azerbaijan
- Coordinates: 40°15′59″N 47°40′56″E
- Country: Azerbaijan
- Rayon: Zardab

Population
  - Total: 2,492
- Time zone: UTC+4 (AZT)
  - Summer (DST): UTC+5 (AZT)

Qoşaoba (also, Koshaoba) is a village and municipality in the Zardab Rayon of Azerbaijan. It has a population of 2,492.
