= Məmmədqasımlı =

- Municipality
- Location within Azerbaijan
- Coordinates: 40°12′06″N 47°35′39″E
- Country: Azerbaijan
- Rayon: Zardab

Population
  - Total: 1,988
- Time zone: UTC+4 (AZT)
  - Summer (DST): UTC+5 (AZT)

Məmmədqasımlı (also, Mamedkasymly) is a village and municipality in the Zardab Rayon of Azerbaijan. It has a population of 1,988.
