= Allahqulubağı =

Coordinates: 40°11′20″N 47°40′00″E

Allahqulubağı (also, Allahgulubaghy) is a village and municipality in the Zardab District of Azerbaijan. It has a population of 518.
