= Məlikumudlu =

Village and municipality in Zardab Rayon, Azerbaijan

Coordinates: 40°20′N 47°45′E

Məlikumudlu is a village and municipality in the Zardab Rayon of Azerbaijan. It has a population of 1,295.
