= Şəftəhal =

- Municipality
- Location within Azerbaijan
- Coordinates: 40°06′54″N 47°50′03″E
- Country: Azerbaijan
- Rayon: Zardab

Population
  - Total: 834
- Time zone: UTC+4 (AZT)
  - Summer (DST): UTC+5 (AZT)

Şəftəhal (also, Shaftakhal) is a village and municipality in the Zardab Rayon of Azerbaijan. It has a population of 834.
