= Qəbələ Müskürlü =

- Location within Azerbaijan
- Coordinates: 40°32′49″N 47°39′04″E
- Country: Azerbaijan
- Rayon: Goychay
- Time zone: UTC+4 (AZT)
  - Summer (DST): UTC+5 (AZT)

Qəbələ Müskürlü (also, Kabalamyuskyurli and Kebele-Myuskyurlyu) is a village in the Goychay Rayon of Azerbaijan. The village forms part of the municipality of Müskürlü.
