= Təzə Şilyan =

- Municipality
- Location within Azerbaijan
- Coordinates: 40°24′59″N 47°56′24″E
- Country: Azerbaijan
- Rayon: Ujar

Population
  - Total: 2,734
- Time zone: UTC+4 (AZT)
  - Summer (DST): UTC+5 (AZT)

Təzə Şilyan (also, Taza-Shil’yan) is a village and municipality in the Ujar Rayon of Azerbaijan. It has a population of 2,734.
