= Alpi =

Alpi may refer to:

- ALPI, an enzyme
- Alpi, the Italian word for the Alps
- Alpı (disambiguation), several places in Turkey and Azerbaijan
- Alpi Aviation, an Italian aircraft manufacturer
