= Murty =

Murty may refer to:

== Places ==
- Mırtı (disambiguation), places in Azerbaijan

== People ==
- Murthy § Murty, people with the given name and surname

== See also ==
- Murti
