= Caraca =

Caraca may refer to:

- Caraça (born 1932), Portuguese footballer
- Roman-era city of moot location in Hispania Tarraconensis, variously identified with current-day places as Taracena or Carabaña, Spain.
- Çərəcə, Azerbaijan
