= Körpükənd =

- Municipality
- Location within Azerbaijan
- Coordinates: 40°16′19″N 47°30′3″E
- Country: Azerbaijan
- Rayon: Zardab

Population
  - Total: 1,409
- Time zone: UTC+4 (AZT)
  - Summer (DST): UTC+5 (AZT)

Körpükənd (also, Kërpyukend) is a village and municipality in the Zardab Rayon of Azerbaijan. It has a population of 1,409.
