= Mırtı =

Mırtı, Myrty, or Mirti may refer to:

- Mırtı, Agsu, Azerbaijan
- Mırtı, Goychay, Azerbaijan
- Mirti (Rome Metro), a railway station in Rome, Italy
