= Cırkürd =

- Location within Azerbaijan
- Coordinates: 40°34′N 47°53′E
- Country: Azerbaijan
- Rayon: Goychay
- Time zone: UTC+4 (AZT)
  - Summer (DST): UTC+5 (AZT)

Cırkürd (also, Dzhyrkurd and Dzhyrkurt) is a village in the Goychay Rayon of Azerbaijan.
