= Potu, Goychay =

Potu
- Municipality
- Location within Azerbaijan
- Coordinates: 40°36′49″N 47°44′43″E
- Country: Azerbaijan
- Rayon: Goychay

Population
  - Total: 3,567
- Time zone: UTC+4 (AZT)
  - Summer (DST): UTC+5 (AZT)

Potu is a village and municipality in the Goychay Rayon of Azerbaijan. It has a population of 3,567. The municipality consists of the villages of Potu, Kürd, and Ulaşlı Şıxlı.
