= Mirzəhüseynli =

- Municipality
- Location within Azerbaijan
- Coordinates: 40°39′26″N 47°38′50″E
- Country: Azerbaijan
- Rayon: Goychay

Population
  - Total: 756
- Time zone: UTC+4 (AZT)
  - Summer (DST): UTC+5 (AZT)

Mirzəhüseynli (also, Mirzaguseynli and Mirza-Useynly) is a village and municipality in the Goychay Rayon of Azerbaijan. It has a population of 756.
