= Türkəçi =

- Municipality
- Location within Azerbaijan
- Coordinates: 40°28′N 47°47′E
- Country: Azerbaijan
- Rayon: Ujar

Population
  - Total: 429
- Time zone: UTC+4 (AZT)
  - Summer (DST): UTC+5 (AZT)

Türkəçi (also, Türkəci, Tyuri-Gadzhi, and Tyurkachi) is a village and municipality in the Ujar Rayon of Azerbaijan. It has a population of 429.
