= Yenikənd, Goychay =

Yenikənd
- Location within Azerbaijan
- Coordinates: 40°31′21″N 47°45′33″E
- Country: Azerbaijan
- Rayon: Goychay
- Time zone: UTC+4 (AZT)
  - Summer (DST): UTC+5 (AZT)

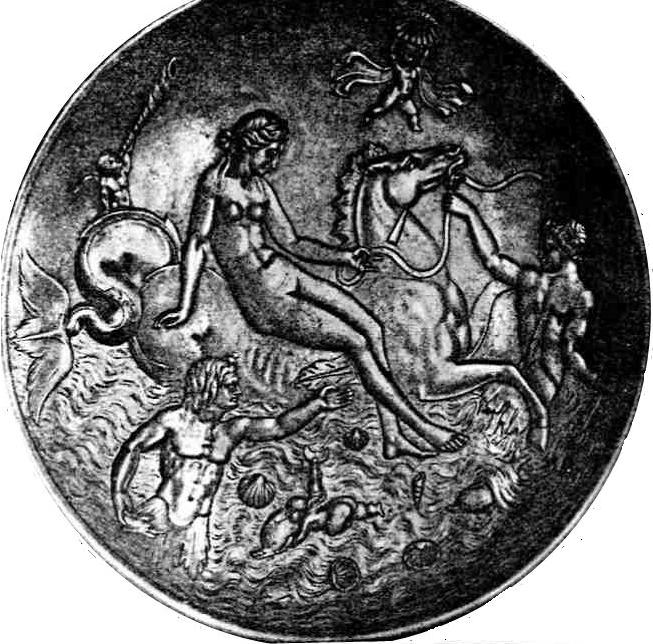
Silver plate of the 2nd century from the village

Yenikənd (also, Yenikend) is a village in the Goychay Rayon of Azerbaijan. The village forms part of the municipality of Kürdşaban.
