= Şıxbağı =

- Municipality
- Location within Azerbaijan
- Coordinates: 40°08′14″N 47°47′38″E
- Country: Azerbaijan
- Rayon: Zardab

Population
  - Total: 396
- Time zone: UTC+4 (AZT)
  - Summer (DST): UTC+5 (AZT)

Şıxbağı (also, Şıhbağı, Shikhbagi, Shykhbagy, and Şıxbağ) is a village and municipality in the Zardab Rayon of Azerbaijan. It has a population of 396.
