= Şahsoltanlı =

- Municipality
- Location within Azerbaijan
- Coordinates: 40°37′11″N 48°03′03″E
- Country: Azerbaijan
- Rayon: Goychay

Population
  - Total: 991
- Time zone: UTC+4 (AZT)
  - Summer (DST): UTC+5 (AZT)

Şahsoltanlı (also, Shakhsoltanly) is a village and municipality in the Goychay Rayon of Azerbaijan. It has a population of 991.
