= Kürdəmiş =

- Municipality
- Location within Azerbaijan
- Coordinates: 40°35′N 47°47′E
- Country: Azerbaijan
- Rayon: Goychay

Population
  - Total: 1,275
- Time zone: UTC+4 (AZT)
  - Summer (DST): UTC+5 (AZT)

Kürdəmiş (also, Kyurdamish) is a village and municipality in the Goychay Rayon of Azerbaijan. It has a population of 1,275. The municipality consists of the villages of Kürdəmiş and Türkmən.
