= Xəlitli =

- Municipality
- Location within Azerbaijan
- Coordinates: 40°34′35″N 47°41′31″E
- Country: Azerbaijan
- Rayon: Goychay

Population
  - Total: 1,158
- Time zone: UTC+4 (AZT)
  - Summer (DST): UTC+5 (AZT)

Xəlitli (also, Xalidli, Khalidly and Khalydly) is a village and municipality in the Goychay Rayon of Azerbaijan. It has a population of 1,158.
