= Dəli Quşçu =

- Municipality
- Location within Azerbaijan
- Coordinates: 40°13′06″N 47°45′06″E
- Country: Azerbaijan
- Rayon: Zardab

Population
  - Total: 1,245
- Time zone: UTC+4 (AZT)
  - Summer (DST): UTC+5 (AZT)

Dəli Quşçu (also, Dəliquşçu) is a village and municipality in the Zardab Rayon of Azerbaijan. It has a population of 1,245.
