= Bağırbəyli =

- Location within Azerbaijan
- Coordinates: 40°30′N 47°45′E
- Country: Azerbaijan
- Rayon: Ujar
- Time zone: UTC+4 (AZT)
  - Summer (DST): UTC+5 (AZT)

Bağırbəyli (also, Bagyrbeyli) is a village in the Ujar Rayon of Azerbaijan. The village forms part of the municipality of Quləbənd.
