= Çayırlı, Azerbaijan =

Village and municipality in Azerbaijan

Coordinates: 40°37′N 47°45′E

Çayırlı is a village and municipality in the Goychay Rayon of Azerbaijan. The municipality consists of the villages of Çayırlı and Qubadlı Şıxlı.
