= Qazıqumlaq =

- Municipality
- Location within Azerbaijan
- Coordinates: 40°32′10″N 47°31′06″E
- Country: Azerbaijan
- Rayon: Ujar

Population
  - Total: 4,147
- Time zone: UTC+4 (AZT)
  - Summer (DST): UTC+5 (AZT)

Qazıqumlaq (also, Kazykumlak and Kazykumlakh) is a village and municipality in the Ujar Rayon of Azerbaijan. It has a population of 4,147.
