= Burunlu, Zardab =

Burunlu
- Municipality
- Location within Azerbaijan
- Coordinates: 40°14′24″N 47°31′18″E
- Country: Azerbaijan
- Rayon: Zardab

Population
  - Total: 622
- Time zone: UTC+4 (AZT)
  - Summer (DST): UTC+5 (AZT)

Burunlu is a village and municipality in the Zardab Rayon of Azerbaijan. It has a population of 622.
