= Bəydövül =

- Municipality
- Location within Azerbaijan
- Coordinates: 40°30′40″N 47°54′04″E
- Country: Azerbaijan
- Rayon: Goychay

Population
  - Total: 1,308
- Time zone: UTC+4 (AZT)
  - Summer (DST): UTC+5 (AZT)

Bəydövül (also, Bəydəvil, Beydavil and Beydeyul’) is a village and municipality in the Goychay Rayon of Azerbaijan. It has a population of 1,308.
