= Türkmən, Goychay =

Türkmən
- Location within Azerbaijan
- Coordinates: 40°36′N 47°46′E
- Country: Azerbaijan
- Rayon: Goychay
- Time zone: UTC+4 (AZT)
  - Summer (DST): UTC+5 (AZT)

Türkmən (also, Turkman) is a village in the Goychay Rayon of Azerbaijan. The village forms part of the municipality of Kürdəmiş.
