= Əyyubbəyli =

- Location within Azerbaijan
- Coordinates: 40°37′N 48°14′E
- Country: Azerbaijan
- Rayon: Ismailli
- Municipality: Gəraybəyli
- Time zone: UTC+4 (AZT)
  - Summer (DST): UTC+5 (AZT)

Əyyubbəyli (also, Əyyubbəli and Eyubbeyli) is a village in the Ismailli Rayon of Azerbaijan. The village forms part of the municipality of Gəraybəyli.
