= Lək, Ujar =

Lək
- Municipality
- Location within Azerbaijan
- Coordinates: 40°22′59″N 47°39′25″E
- Country: Azerbaijan
- Rayon: Ujar

Population
  - Total: 3,494
- Time zone: UTC+4 (AZT)
  - Summer (DST): UTC+5 (AZT)

Lək (also, Lyak and Lyak-Ikindzhi) is a village and municipality in the Ujar Rayon of Azerbaijan. It has a population of 3,494.
