= Məlikballı =

Məlikballı Malikballi, Melikbally
- Municipality
- Location within Azerbaijan
- Coordinates: 40°33′00″N 47°32′35″E
- Country: Azerbaijan
- Rayon: Agdash

Population
  - Total: 1,372
- Time zone: UTC+4 (AZT)

Məlikballı (also Malikballi and Melikbally) is a village and municipality in the Ujar Rayon of Azerbaijan. It has a population of 1,372.
