= Əlikənd, Goychay =

Əlikənd
- Location within Azerbaijan
- Coordinates: 40°33′07″N 47°53′17″E
- Country: Azerbaijan
- Rayon: Goychay
- Time zone: UTC+4 (AZT)
  - Summer (DST): UTC+5 (AZT)

Əlikənd (also, Alikend and Alykend) is a village in the Goychay Rayon of Azerbaijan. The village forms part of the municipality of Mırtı.
