= Yuxarı Şilyan =

- Municipality
- Location within Azerbaijan
- Coordinates: 40°21′32″N 47°48′10″E
- Country: Azerbaijan
- Rayon: Ujar

Population
  - Total: 4,263
- Time zone: UTC+4 (AZT)
  - Summer (DST): UTC+5 (AZT)

Yuxarı Şilyan (also, Yukhary-Shil’yan and Yukh-Shil’yan) is a village and municipality in the Ujar Rayon of Azerbaijan. It has a population of 4,263.
