= Çərəkə =

- Municipality
- Location within Azerbaijan
- Coordinates: 40°33′41″N 47°41′14″E
- Country: Azerbaijan
- Rayon: Goychay

Population
  - Total: 3,480
- Time zone: UTC+4 (AZT)
  - Summer (DST): UTC+5 (AZT)

Çərəkə (also, Cherakya, Chereke, and Gäräkä) is a village and municipality in the Goychay Rayon of Azerbaijan. It has a population of 3,840.
