= Ali Kerim =

Azerbaijani poet (1931–1969)

- Born: 18 March 1931; Goychay, Azerbaijan
- Died: 30 June 1969 (aged 38); Baku
- Occupation: writer
- Website: eli-kerim.net

Ali Kerim (Azerbaijani: Əli Kərim) (18 March 1931, in Goychay – 30 June 1969, in Baku) was a 20th-century poet and translator from Azerbaijan and a member of the Azerbaijan Writers Union.

== Biography ==
Kerim was an originally from Azerbaijan. His father, Pasha Karimov, was a worker in Goychay. In 1948, Kerim attended the Baku State University, in Azerbaijan, wanting to pursue the faculty of Philology. However, the lack of dormitories made him enroll at the faculty of drama in the Theater Institute instead.

From his third course onward, he continued his education at Gorky Institute of World Literature in Moscow. In 1955, he graduated from the university with honors.

After returning to Baku, he worked as Head of the Department of Poetry for the magazine "Azerbaijan".

== Contributions ==
His first poem Təzə Müəllim ("New Teacher"), was published in the newspaper Azərbaycan Pioneri ("Pioneer of Azerbaijan") in 1948. He received an award for his epic, entitled Ilk Simfoniya ("First Symphony"), at the Sixty-Sixth Festival of World Youth and Students, which was held in Moscow in 1957. His first book, Два влюбленных ("Two Loves"), was published in Moscow in Russian, in connection with the decade of Azerbaijani literature in 1958. His other works include Always in Visit, Red Wings, Return Mothers Debt and Steps (Novel).

Kerim's was considered as a 'talented, young writer with a positive outlook' along with contemporary poets and writer in Azarbaijan.

== Legacy ==
Many of his works have been published since his death. He died in Baku on 30 June 1969 and was buried in the eponymous Ali Kerim Park in Goychay. There is a poetry club named after him in Sumqayit. There are streets in Baku, Sabirabad, and Goychay named Ali Kerim. Every year, the Azerbaijani Writers Union gives out the Ali Kerim Reward, worth 2,000 manat, for the best poetic work.

== Family ==
Karim had three sons. His eldest son is Doctor of Philology and scientist Pasha Kerimov. His middle son, Azer Kerimov, is the well-known mathematician, professor, and doctor of physico-mathematical sciences. His youngest, Orxan Kerimov, was a well-known economist in Azerbaijan who died on 20 July 2015. His wife, Elza Kerimova, and sons have published many books, articles and translations of and about Ali Kerim's work.

== Filmography ==
Film studios, TV channel	Film title	Year	Screenwriter	Author	Directed by	Actor	Film about the poet	Type
Film studio "Azerbaijanfilm"	Stone	1977	✗	✓	✗	✗	✗	A short animated film
LIDER TV	Seven Emotions	2002	✗	✗	✗	✗	✓	Documentary
ANS TV	Last Breath	2009	✗	✗	✗	✗	✓	Documentary
AZTV	Poet of Future	2010	✗	✗	✗	✗	✓	Documentary
ITV	Ali Kerim	2013	✗	✗	✗	✗	✓	Documentary
ITV	TV Program "Yadigarlar"(06.01.2015)	2015	✗	✗	✗	✗	✓	TV Program
Xezer TV	TV Program "Konul Dunyamiz"(01.11.2015)	2015	✗	✗	✗	✗	✓	TV Program

== Books ==
1.İki sevgili. Baku: Azərnəşr, 1960, 60 page.

2.Həmişə səfərdə. Baku: Azərnəşr, 1963, 63 page.

3.Qızıl qanad. Baku: Azərnəşr, 1965, 132 page.

4.Qaytar ana borcunu. Baku: Gənclik, 1970, 223 page.

5.Uşaqlar və ulduzlar. Baku: Gənclik, 1971, 71 page.

6.Səfərdən sonra. Baku: Azərnəşr, 1972, 192 page.

7.Tənbəl ayı balası. Baku: Uşaqgəncnəşr, 1973, 15 page.

8.Seçilmiş əsərləri (in two volumes). I volume. Baku: Azərnəşr, 1974, 407 page.

9.Seçilmiş əsərləri (in two volumes). II volume. Baku: Azərnəşr, 1975, 185 page.

10.Pillələr (novel). Baku: Gənclik, 1978, 160 page.

11.Qız və kəpənək. Baku: Gənclik, 1979, 56 page.

12.Qayıt. Baku: Yazıçı, 1983, 288 page.

13.Pillələr (novel). Baku: Yazıçı, 1987, 262 page.

14.Seçilmiş əsərləri (in two volumes). I volume. Baku: Azərnəşr, 1991, 272 page.

15.Seçilmiş əsərləri (in two volumes). II volume. Baku: Azərnəşr, 1991, 251 page.

16.Mavi nəğmənin sahilində. Baku: Yazıçı, 1991, 197 page.

17.«Два влюбленных». Moscow

18.Seçilmiş əsərləri. Baku: Lider, 2004, 336 page.(Order of the President of the Republic of Azerbaijan Mr.İlham Aliyev)

19.Seçilmiş əsərləri (in two volumes). I volume. Baku: Şərq-Qərb, 2013, 376 page.(The Ministry of Culture and Tourism of Republic of Azerbaijan)

20.Seçilmiş əsərləri (in two volumes). II volume. Baku: Şərq-Qərb, 2014, 496 page.(The Ministry of Culture and Tourism of Republic of Azerbaijan)

21.Seçilmiş əsərləri ("Nə xoşbəxt imişəm bir zaman, Allah..."). Baku: Kitab Klubu, 2015, 384 page.(The book is dedicated to his deceased son, Orkhan Karimov) and others.

== Books dedicated to him ==
1. The author of the book: Feyzi Mustafayev, «Dinmə, ey kədər» (1986)

2. The author of the book: Cavanşir Yusifli, «Azərbaycan poeziyasında Əli Kərim mərhələsi» (2005)

3. The author of the book: Elza Kərim, «Nə xoşbəxt imişəm» (2010)

4. The author of the book: Cavanşir Yusifli, «Əli Kərim üslubu, yaxud fərdi yaradıcılıqdan ədəbiyyat tarixinə baxış» (2010),

5. The author of the book: Sona Xəyal, «Əli Kərim» (2011)

6. The author of the book: Altay Məmmədov, «Tanıdığım Əli Kərim» (2012) and others.

7. The author of the book: İfrat Əliyeva, «Çırağı sönməyən poeziya» (2017)
