= Çərəcə =

- Municipality
- Location within Azerbaijan
- Coordinates: 40°34′19″N 47°42′26″E
- Country: Azerbaijan
- Rayon: Goychay

Population
  - Total: 985
- Time zone: UTC+4 (AZT)
  - Summer (DST): UTC+5 (AZT)

Çərəcə (also, Charadzha, Chardzha, and Charedzha) is a village and municipality in the Goychay Rayon of Azerbaijan. It has a population of 985. The municipality consists of the villages of Çərəcə and Çəyirli.
