= Ulaşlı Şıxlı =

- Location within Azerbaijan
- Coordinates: 40°35′44″N 47°43′18″E
- Country: Azerbaijan
- Rayon: Goychay
- Time zone: UTC+4 (AZT)
  - Summer (DST): UTC+5 (AZT)

Ulaşlı Şıxlı (also spelled Ulashlyshykhly) is a village in the Goychay Rayon of Azerbaijan. The village forms part of the municipality of Potu.
