= Mırtı, Goychay =

Mırtı
- Municipality
- Location within Azerbaijan
- Coordinates: 40°34′18″N 47°52′47″E
- Country: Azerbaijan
- Rayon: Goychay

Population
  - Total: 2,340
- Time zone: UTC+4 (AZT)
  - Summer (DST): UTC+5 (AZT)

Mırtı (also, Myrty) is a village and municipality in the Goychay Rayon of Azerbaijan. It has a population of 2,340. The municipality consists of the villages of Mırtı and Əlikənd.
