= İncə, Goychay =

İncə
- Municipality
- Location within Azerbaijan
- Coordinates: 40°33′29″N 47°58′08″E
- Country: Azerbaijan
- Rayon: Goychay

Population
  - Total: 3,721
- Time zone: UTC+4 (AZT)
  - Summer (DST): UTC+5 (AZT)

İncə (also, İnçə and Incha) is a village and municipality in the Goychay Rayon of Azerbaijan. It has a population of 3,721.
