= Çayarxı =

- Municipality
- Location within Azerbaijan
- Coordinates: 40°37′30″N 47°46′31″E
- Country: Azerbaijan
- Rayon: Goychay

Population
  - Total: 1,574
- Time zone: UTC+4 (AZT)
  - Summer (DST): UTC+5 (AZT)

Çayarxı (also, Chayarkhy) is a village and municipality in the Goychay Rayon of Azerbaijan. It has a population of 1,574.
