= Qaradağlı, Ujar =

Qaradağlı
- Municipality
- Location within Azerbaijan
- Coordinates: 40°28′33″N 47°34′00″E
- Country: Azerbaijan
- Rayon: Ujar

Population
  - Total: 3,037
- Time zone: UTC+4 (AZT)
  - Summer (DST): UTC+5 (AZT)

Qaradağlı (also, Karadaglidjenam and Karadagly) is a village and municipality in the Ujar Rayon of Azerbaijan. It has a population of 3,307.
