= Rəstəcə =

- Municipality
- Location within Azerbaijan
- Coordinates: 40°31′48″N 47°41′40″E
- Country: Azerbaijan
- Rayon: Ujar

Population
  - Total: 1,069
- Time zone: UTC+4 (AZT)
  - Summer (DST): UTC+5 (AZT)

Rəstəcə (also, Rastadzha) is a village and municipality in the Ujar Rayon of Azerbaijan. It has a population of 1,069.
