= Ramal =

- Municipality
- Location within Azerbaijan
- Coordinates: 40°30′01″N 47°29′30″E
- Country: Azerbaijan
- Rayon: Ujar

Population
  - Total: 778
- Time zone: UTC+4 (AZT)
  - Summer (DST): UTC+5 (AZT)

Ramal is a village and municipality in the Ujar Rayon of Azerbaijan. It has a population of 778.
