= Kürdşaban =

- Municipality
- Location within Azerbaijan
- Coordinates: 40°32′12″N 47°45′01″E
- Country: Azerbaijan
- Rayon: Goychay

Population
  - Total: 1,051
- Time zone: UTC+4 (AZT)
  - Summer (DST): UTC+5 (AZT)

Kürdşaban (also, Kürşaban and Kyurdshaban) is a village and municipality in the Goychay Rayon of Azerbaijan. It has a population of 1,051. The municipality consists of the villages of Kürdşaban and Yenikənd.
