= Quba Apple Festival =

- Frequency: Annually
- Locations: Quba, Azerbaijan
- Country: (Azerbaijan)
- Years active: 2012-Present
- Inaugurated: 2012 October

Apple Festival (Azerbaijani: Alma bayramı) is a cultural festival that is celebrated annually in Guba, Azerbaijan on the days of harvesting apples.

The inaugural event was held in 2012. The festival features Azerbaijani fruit-cuisine mainly the apples from Quba. Although the holiday is called "Apple Feast", it is dedicated not only to apples, but to other fruit crops.

On the days of the holiday, in the city of Quba - the horticultural center of Azerbaijan, exhibitions are held where gardeners demonstrate different varieties of apples and various products from them.

== See also ==
- Goychay Pomegranate Festival
