= Alpı =

Alpı is a Turkic word that may refer to:

- Alpı, Kastamonu, a village in the district of Kastamonu, Kastamonu Province, Turkey
- Alpı, Ulus, a village in the district of Ulus, Bartın Province, Turkey
- Alpı, Ujar, a village and municipality of Ujar Rayon, Azerbaijan
