= Şıxlar, Goychay =

Şıxlar (known as Çəyirli until 2015) is a village in the municipality of Çərəcə in the Goychay Rayon of Azerbaijan.
