= Qazyan, Ujar =

Qazyan
- Municipality
- Location within Azerbaijan
- Coordinates: 40°26′33″N 47°40′36″E
- Country: Azerbaijan
- Rayon: Ujar

Population
  - Total: 16,018
- Time zone: UTC+4 (AZT)
  - Summer (DST): UTC+5 (AZT)

Qazyan (also, Kaz’yan and Kaziyan) is a village and municipality in the Ujar Rayon of Azerbaijan. It has a population of 6,018.

== Notable natives ==
- Xalil Babayev — Police major USSR
- Ehtiram Aliyev — Colonel and national hero of Azerbaijan.
