= Kürd, Goychay =

Kurd
- Azerbaijani: Kürd
- Location within Azerbaijan
- Coordinates: 40°37′N 47°44′E
- Country: Azerbaijan
- District: Goychay
- Time zone: UTC+4 (AZT)
  - Summer (DST): UTC+5 (AZT)

Kürd (also, Kurd) is a village in the Goychay District of Azerbaijan. The village forms part of the municipality of Potu.
