= Qızılağac, Goychay =

Qızılağac
- Municipality
- Location within Azerbaijan
- Coordinates: 40°34′13″N 47°44′56″E
- Country: Azerbaijan
- Rayon: Goychay

Population
  - Total: 1,365
- Time zone: UTC+4 (AZT)
  - Summer (DST): UTC+5 (AZT)

Qızılağac (also, Kyzylagach and Kyzylagadzh) is a village and municipality in the Goychay Rayon of Azerbaijan. It has a population of 1,365. The municipality consists of the villages of Qızılağac and Mollahacılı.
