= Küçəkənd =

- Municipality
- Location within Azerbaijan
- Coordinates: 40°28′50″N 47°47′35″E
- Country: Azerbaijan
- Rayon: Ujar

Population
  - Total: 1,399
- Time zone: UTC+4 (AZT)
  - Summer (DST): UTC+5 (AZT)

Küçəkənd (also, Kyuchakend) is a village and municipality in the Ujar Rayon of Azerbaijan. It has a population of 1,399.
