= Vəlixanlı, Zardab =

Vəlixanlı
- Location within Azerbaijan
- Coordinates: 40°14′18″N 47°45′15″E
- Country: Azerbaijan
- Rayon: Zardab
- Time zone: UTC+4 (AZT)
  - Summer (DST): UTC+5 (AZT)

Vəlixanlı (also, Velikhanly) is a former village in the Zardab Rayon of Azerbaijan.
