= Yuxarı Çiyni =

- Municipality
- Location within Azerbaijan
- Coordinates: 40°26′51″N 47°47′15″E
- Country: Azerbaijan
- Rayon: Ujar
- Time zone: UTC+4 (AZT)
  - Summer (DST): UTC+5 (AZT)

Yuxarı Çiyni (also, Chiyni) is a village and municipality in the Ujar Rayon of Azerbaijan.
