= Ərəbşahverdi, Goychay =

Ərəbşahverdi
- Location within Azerbaijan
- Coordinates: 40°38′14″N 47°42′43″E
- Country: Azerbaijan
- Rayon: Goychay
- Municipality: Mallı-Şıxlı
- Time zone: UTC+4 (AZT)
  - Summer (DST): UTC+5 (AZT)

Ərəbşahverdi (also, Arabshakhverdi) is a village in the Goychay Rayon of Azerbaijan. The village forms part of the municipality of Mallı-Şıxlı.
