= Mamaylı =

- Municipality
- Location within Azerbaijan Location within Shaki-Zagatala Economic Region
- Coordinates: 40°49′10″N 47°44′07″E
- Country: Azerbaijan
- Rayon: Qabala

Population
  - Total: 870
- Time zone: UTC+4 (AZT)
  - Summer (DST): UTC+5 (AZT)

Mamaylı (also, Mamayly) is a village and municipality in the Qabala Rayon of Azerbaijan. It has a population of 870. The municipality consists of the villages of Mamaylı and Ovcullu.
