= Siləyli, Zardab =

Siləyli
- Municipality
- Location within Azerbaijan
- Coordinates: 40°22′02″N 47°31′20″E
- Country: Azerbaijan
- Rayon: Zardab

Population
  - Total: 447
- Time zone: UTC+4 (AZT)
  - Summer (DST): UTC+5 (AZT)

Siləyli (also, Sileyli) is a village and municipality in the Zardab Rayon of Azerbaijan. It has a population of 447.
