= Ləkçılpaq =

Ləkçıplaq
- Municipality
- Location within Azerbaijan
- Coordinates: 40°34′11″N 47°51′19″E
- Country: Azerbaijan
- Rayon: Goychay

Population
  - Total: 5,328
- Time zone: UTC+4 (AZT)
  - Summer (DST): UTC+5 (AZT)

Ləkçıplaq (also, Lyakchiplak, Lyakchylpak, and Lyakchyplag) is a village and municipality in the Goychay Rayon of Azerbaijan. It has a population of 5,328.
