= Mallı-Şıxlı =

Municipality in Azerbaijan

Coordinates: 40°36′N 47°41′E

Mallı-Şıxlı is a municipality in the Goychay Rayon of central Azerbaijan. It has a population of 1,870. The municipality consists of the villages of Mallı, Şıxlı, and Ərəbşahverdi.
