= Şıxəmir =

- Location within Azerbaijan
- Coordinates: 40°30′52″N 47°47′24″E
- Country: Azerbaijan
- Rayon: Goychay
- Time zone: UTC+4 (AZT)
  - Summer (DST): UTC+5 (AZT)

Şıxəmir (also, Şıxmir, Shikhamir, and Shykhamir) is a village in the Goychay Rayon of Azerbaijan. The village forms part of the municipality of Məlikkənd.
