= Ehtiram Aliyev =

Azerbaijani colonel (1972 –2026)

- Born: 1 August 1972
- Died: 15 November 2026 (aged 54)

Ehtiram Aliyev (Azerbaijani: Ehtiram İsrayıl oğlu Əliyev; 1 August 1972 – 15 November 2026) was an Azerbaijani colonel.

== Life and career ==
Aliyev was born in Ujar District on 1 August 1972. He served during the First Nagorno-Karabakh War.

Aliyev died on 15 November 2026, at the age of 54.

== Awards ==
- National Hero of Azerbaijan: 4 April 1995.
