= Rauf Atakishiyev =

Rauf Atakishiyev Rauf Atakişiyev
- Born: July 15, 1925; Goychay, Azerbaijani SSR, Soviet Union
- Died: February 3, 1994 (aged 68)
- Genres: Classical
- Occupations: Singer, pianist
- Instruments: Singing, piano

Rauf Israfil oglu Atakishiyev (Note: Azerbaijani: Rauf İsrafil oğlu Atakişiyev; Russian: Рауф Исрафил оглы Атакишиев, romanized: Rauf Israfil ogly Atakishiyev) (July 15, 1925 – February 3, 1994) was a Soviet Azerbaijani singer, pianist, singer-soloist, People's Artist of the Azerbaijan SSR (1967), and professor (1972).

== Biography ==
Rauf Atakishiyev was born on July 15, 1925, in Goychay, Azerbaijan. In 1943, he was admitted to the Azerbaijan State Conservatoire. From 1946, he studied at the Moscow State Conservatoire specialising in fortepiano taught by Konstantin Igumnov, as well as in vocal arts taught by Antonina Nezhdanova. In 1952, after finishing his graduate studies, he returned to Baku and began performing as a pianist and solo singer at the Opera and Ballet Theatre. From 1953, he began teaching at the Azerbaijan State Conservatoire. Beginning in 1969, he headed the faculty of fortepiano. In 1967, Atakishiyev was awarded the title of the People's Artist of Azerbaijan. In 1972, he was given a professor's degree from the Azerbaijan State Conservatoire. Atakishiyev was awarded the Jubilee Medal of Lenin, the Order of Friendship of Peoples, as well as honorary diplomas of the Presidium of the Supreme Soviet of the USSR and the Moldavian SSR. Atakishiyev died on February 3, 1994.
