= Gəraybəyli, Ujar =

Gəraybəyli
- Municipality
- Location within Azerbaijan
- Coordinates: 40°31′51″N 47°39′21″E
- Country: Azerbaijan
- Rayon: Ujar

Population
  - Total: 1,128
- Time zone: UTC+4 (AZT)
  - Summer (DST): UTC+5 (AZT)

Gəraybəyli (also, Qarabəyli and Geraybeyli) is a village and municipality in the Ujar Rayon of Azerbaijan. It has a population of 1,128.
