= Axtaçı-Qarabucaq =

Coordinates: 40.389°N 48.038°E

Axtaçı-Qarabucaq (known as Qarabucaq until 2015) is a village and municipality in the Kurdamir District of Azerbaijan.
