= Hapıtlı, Agdash =

Hapıtlı
- Location within Azerbaijan
- Coordinates: 40°29′18″N 47°23′33″E
- Country: Azerbaijan
- Rayon: Agdash
- Municipality: Aşağı Ləki
- Time zone: UTC+4 (AZT)
  - Summer (DST): UTC+5 (AZT)

Hapıtlı (also, Gapytly and Khapytly) is a village in the Agdash Rayon of Azerbaijan. The village forms part of the municipality of Aşağı Ləki.
