= Türkədi, Sabirabad =

Türkədi
- Municipality
- Location within Azerbaijan
- Coordinates: 40°02′31″N 48°25′04″E
- Country: Azerbaijan
- Rayon: Sabirabad

Population
  - Total: 1,960
- Time zone: UTC+4 (AZT)
  - Summer (DST): UTC+5 (AZT)

Türkədi (also, Kyurpedy and Tyurkedi) is a village and municipality in the Sabirabad Rayon of Azerbaijan. It has a population of 1,960.
