= Cəyirli, Goychay =

Cəyirli
- Municipality
- Location within Azerbaijan
- Coordinates: 40°34′N 47°42′E
- Country: Azerbaijan
- Rayon: Goychay

Population
  - Total: 1,844
- Time zone: UTC+4 (AZT)
  - Summer (DST): UTC+5 (AZT)

Cəyirli (also, Çayırlı, Dzhairli, Dzheirli, and Dzheyirli) is a village and municipality in the Goychay Rayon of Azerbaijan. It has a population of 1,844. The municipality consists of the villages of Cəyirli and Qubadlı Şıxlı.
