= Axtaçı Şirvan =

- Municipality
- Location within Azerbaijan
- Coordinates: 40°02′30″N 48°44′53″E
- Country: Azerbaijan
- Rayon: Hajigabul

Population
  - Total: 510
- Time zone: UTC+4 (AZT)
  - Summer (DST): UTC+5 (AZT)

Axtaçı Şirvan (also, Akhtachi and Akhtachy Shirvan) is a village and municipality in the Hajigabul Rayon of Azerbaijan. It has a population of 510.
