= Ovcullu =

- Location within Azerbaijan Location within Shaki-Zagatala Economic Region
- Coordinates: 40°48′18″N 47°43′24″E
- Country: Azerbaijan
- Rayon: Qabala
- Municipality: Mamaylı
- Time zone: UTC+4 (AZT)
  - Summer (DST): UTC+5 (AZT)

Ovcullu (also, Ovculu, Oudzhulu, and Ovdzhulu) is a village in the Qabala Rayon of Azerbaijan. The village forms part of the municipality of Mamaylı.
