= Ucar, Azerbaijan =

Ucar
- Entrance to Ucar city

- Location within Azerbaijan
- Coordinates: 40°31′06″N 47°39′15″E
- Country: Azerbaijan
- District: Ujar
- Established: 1941
- Elevation: 17 m (56 ft)

Population (2012)
  - Total: 17,100
- Time zone: UTC+4 (AZT)
- Area code: +994 2021

Ucar (Ujar) is a city and the centre of the Ujar District of Azerbaijan.
