= Qüləbənd =

- Municipality
- Location within Azerbaijan
- Coordinates: 40°28′38″N 47°43′13″E
- Country: Azerbaijan
- Rayon: Ujar

Population
  - Total: 1,077
- Time zone: UTC+4 (AZT)
  - Summer (DST): UTC+5 (AZT)

Qüləbənd (also, Quləbənd, Gyuleband and Kulabend) is a village and municipality in the Ujar Rayon of Azerbaijan. It has a population of 1,077. The municipality consists of the villages of Qüləbənd and Bağırbəyli.
