= Cəyirli, Hajigabul =

Cəyirli
- Location within Azerbaijan
- Coordinates: 40°12′18″N 48°47′31″E
- Country: Azerbaijan
- Rayon: Hajigabul
- Time zone: UTC+4 (AZT)
  - Summer (DST): UTC+5 (AZT)

Cəyirli (also, Dzhagirli) is a village in the Hajigabul Rayon of Azerbaijan.
