= Cəyirli, Shaki =

Cəyirli
- Municipality
- Location within Azerbaijan Location within Shaki-Zagatala Economic Region
- Coordinates: 40°53′16″N 47°16′02″E
- Country: Azerbaijan
- Rayon: Shaki

Population
  - Total: 1,896
- Time zone: UTC+4 (AZT)
  - Summer (DST): UTC+5 (AZT)

Cəyirli (also, Dzheirli and Dzheiyrli) is a village and municipality in the Shaki Rayon of Azerbaijan. It has a population of 1,896.
