= Ovçulu, Shamakhi =

Ovçulu
- Municipality
- Location within Azerbaijan
- Coordinates: 40°27′04″N 48°36′12″E
- Country: Azerbaijan
- Rayon: Shamakhi

Population
  - Total: 1,130
- Time zone: UTC+4 (AZT)
  - Summer (DST): UTC+5 (AZT)

Ovçulu (also, Ovculu, Ovgulu, and Ovchulu) is a village and municipality in the Shamakhi Rayon of Azerbaijan. It has a population of 1,130.
