= Əlikənd, Ujar =

Əlikənd
- Municipality
- Location within Azerbaijan
- Coordinates: 40°29′45″N 47°30′32″E
- Country: Azerbaijan
- Rayon: Ujar

Population
  - Total: 821
- Time zone: UTC+4 (AZT)
  - Summer (DST): UTC+5 (AZT)

Əlikənd (also, Alikend and Alykend) is a village and municipality in the Ujar Rayon of Azerbaijan. It has a population of 821.
