= Müsüslü =

- Municipality
- Location within Azerbaijan
- Coordinates: 40°27′12″N 47°54′44″E
- Country: Azerbaijan
- Rayon: Ujar

Population (2008)
  - Total: 1,427
- Time zone: UTC+4 (AZT)
  - Summer (DST): UTC+5 (AZT)

Müsüslü (also, Myusyush, Myusyusli, Myusyusly, and Myusyuslyu) is a village and municipality in the Ujar Rayon of Azerbaijan. It has a population of 1,427.
