= Hacıalılı, Samukh =

Hacıalılı
- Municipality
- Location within Azerbaijan
- Coordinates: 40°48′24″N 46°26′43″E
- Country: Azerbaijan
- Rayon: Samukh

Population
  - Total: 1,097
- Time zone: UTC+4 (AZT)
  - Summer (DST): UTC+5 (AZT)

Hacıalılı is a village and municipality in the Samukh Rayon of Azerbaijan. It has a population of 1,097.
