= Pirkənd, Agdash =

Pirkənd
- Location within Azerbaijan
- Coordinates: 40°43′N 47°24′E
- Country: Azerbaijan
- Rayon: Agdash
- Time zone: UTC+4 (AZT)
  - Summer (DST): UTC+5 (AZT)

Pirkənd (also, Pirkend) is a village in the Agdash Rayon of Azerbaijan.
