= Yenikənd, Sabirabad =

Yenikənd
- Municipality
- Location within Azerbaijan
- Coordinates: 40°06′36″N 48°34′46″E
- Country: Azerbaijan
- Rayon: Sabirabad

Population
  - Total: 2,016
- Time zone: UTC+4 (AZT)
  - Summer (DST): UTC+5 (AZT)

Yenikənd (also, Yenikend) is a village and municipality in the Sabirabad Rayon of Azerbaijan. It has a population of 2,016.
