= Ovçulu, Agdash =

Ovçulu
- Location within Azerbaijan
- Coordinates: 40°27′01″N 47°26′08″E
- Country: Azerbaijan
- Rayon: Agdash
- Municipality: Aşağı Ləki
- Time zone: UTC+4 (AZT)
  - Summer (DST): UTC+5 (AZT)

Ovçulu (also, Ovchulu) is a village in the Agdash Rayon of Azerbaijan. The village forms part of the municipality of Aşağı Ləki.
