= Yukhary Karasakkal =

- Location within Azerbaijan
- Coordinates: 40°54′N 46°27′E
- Country: Azerbaijan
- Rayon: Samukh
- Time zone: UTC+4 (AZT)
  - Summer (DST): UTC+5 (AZT)

Yukhary Karasakkal (also, Karasakhkal) is a village in the Samukh Rayon of Azerbaijan.
