= Axtaçı, Sabirabad =

Axtaçı
- Municipality
- Location within Azerbaijan
- Coordinates: 40°01′N 48°20′E
- Country: Azerbaijan
- Rayon: Sabirabad

Population
  - Total: 302
- Time zone: UTC+4 (AZT)
  - Summer (DST): UTC+5 (AZT)

Axtaçı (also, Akhtachi, Shaumyan-Akhtachi, Akhtachy Shaumyan, Akhtachi-Shaumyan, and Akhtachy Mugan) is a village and municipality in the Sabirabad Rayon of Azerbaijan. It has a population of 302.
