= Alpout, Ujar =

Alpout
- Municipality
- Location within Azerbaijan
- Coordinates: 40°26′25″N 47°36′02″E
- Country: Azerbaijan
- Rayon: Ujar

Population
  - Total: 3,414
- Time zone: UTC+4 (AZT)
  - Summer (DST): UTC+5 (AZT)

Alpout (also, Alpaut and Ashaga Alpout) is a village and municipality in the Ujar Rayon of Azerbaijan. It has a population of 3,414.
