= Qaracallı, Ujar =

Qaracallı
- Municipality
- Location within Azerbaijan
- Coordinates: 40°25′55″N 47°51′34″E
- Country: Azerbaijan
- Rayon: Ujar

Population
  - Total: 3,292
- Time zone: UTC+4 (AZT)
  - Summer (DST): UTC+5 (AZT)

Qaracallı (also, Karadzhally and Karadzhaly) is a village and municipality in the Ujar Rayon of Azerbaijan. It has a population of 3292.
