= Ərəbşahverdi, Gobustan =

Ərəbşahverdi
- Municipality
- Location within Azerbaijan
- Coordinates: 40°32′N 48°59′E
- Country: Azerbaijan
- Rayon: Gobustan

Population
  - Total: 538
- Time zone: UTC+4 (AZT)
  - Summer (DST): UTC+5 (AZT)

Ərəbşahverdi (also, Arabshakhverdi) is a village and municipality in the Gobustan Rayon of Azerbaijan. It has a population of 538.
