= Pirkənd, Ujar =

Pirkənd
- Municipality
- Location within Azerbaijan
- Coordinates: 40°28′43″N 47°53′04″E
- Country: Azerbaijan
- Rayon: Ujar

Population
  - Total: 993
- Time zone: UTC+4 (AZT)
  - Summer (DST): UTC+5 (AZT)

Pirkənd (also, Pirkend) is a village and municipality in the Ujar Rayon of Azerbaijan. It has a population of 993.
