= Vəlixanlı, Yardymli =

Vəlixanlı
- Municipality
- Location within Azerbaijan
- Coordinates: 38°55′09″N 48°18′47″E
- Country: Azerbaijan
- Rayon: Yardymli
- Time zone: UTC+4 (AZT)
  - Summer (DST): UTC+5 (AZT)

Vəlixanlı (also, Velikhanly) is a village and municipality in the Yardymli Rayon of Azerbaijan.
