= Alpı, Ujar =

Alpı
- Municipality
- Location within Azerbaijan
- Coordinates: 40°29′24″N 47°44′01″E
- Country: Azerbaijan
- Rayon: Ujar

Population
  - Total: 1,215
- Time zone: UTC+4 (AZT)

Alpı (also, Alpy) is a village and municipality in the Ujar Rayon of Azerbaijan. It has a population of 1,215.
