= Aşağı Ləki =

- Municipality
- Location within Azerbaijan
- Coordinates: 40°30′35″N 47°24′42″E
- Country: Azerbaijan
- Rayon: Agdash

Population
  - Total: 2,339
- Time zone: UTC+4 (AZT)
  - Summer (DST): UTC+5 (AZT)

Aşağı Ləki (also, Ashagy Lyaki) is a village and municipality in the Agdash Rayon of Azerbaijan. It has a population of 2,339. The municipality consists of the villages of Aşağı Ləki, Hapıtlı, and Ovçulu.
