= Hacallı, Tovuz =

Hacallı
- Location within Azerbaijan
- Coordinates: 40°56′N 45°31′E
- Country: Azerbaijan
- Rayon: Tovuz
- Time zone: UTC+4 (AZT)
  - Summer (DST): UTC+5 (AZT)

Hacallı (also, Gadzhally) is a village in the Tovuz Rayon of Azerbaijan.
