= Qarabörk =

- Municipality
- Location within Azerbaijan
- Coordinates: 40°29′26″N 47°39′22″E
- Country: Azerbaijan
- Rayon: Ujar

Population
  - Total: 3,255
- Time zone: UTC+4 (AZT)
  - Summer (DST): UTC+5 (AZT)

Qarabörk (also, Qara-börk and Karabërk) is a village and municipality in the Ujar Rayon of Azerbaijan. It has a population of 3,255.
