= Qubadlı Şıxlı =

Coordinates: 40°36′N 47°46′E

Qubadlı Şıxlı is a village in the municipality of Cəyirli in the Goychay Rayon of Azerbaijan.
