= Kür Qarabucaq =

- Municipality
- Location within Azerbaijan
- Coordinates: 39°28′N 49°02′E
- Country: Azerbaijan
- Rayon: Neftchala

Population
  - Total: 1,103
- Time zone: UTC+4 (AZT)
  - Summer (DST): UTC+5 (AZT)

Kür Qarabucaq (also, Kyurkarabudzhak, Karabudzhag, Karabudzhakh, and Karabujakh) is a village and municipality in the Neftchala Rayon of Azerbaijan. It has a population of 1,103.
