= Xələc, Ujar =

Xələc
- Municipality
- Location within Azerbaijan
- Coordinates: 40°21′03″N 47°41′06″E
- Country: Azerbaijan
- Rayon: Ujar

Population
  - Total: 853
- Time zone: UTC+4 (AZT)
  - Summer (DST): UTC+5 (AZT)

Xələc (also, Xalac, Khaladzh, Khaladzh Pervyy, and Khaladzh Vtoroy) is a village and municipality in the Ujar Rayon of Azerbaijan. It has a population of 853.
