= Cəyirli, Gobustan =

Cəyirli
- Municipality
- Location within Azerbaijan
- Coordinates: 40°34′51″N 48°52′00″E
- Country: Azerbaijan
- Rayon: Gobustan

Population
  - Total: 2,424
- Time zone: UTC+4 (AZT)
  - Summer (DST): UTC+5 (AZT)

Cəyirli (also, Dzhagirli, Dzhagyrli, and Dzheirli) is a village and municipality in the Gobustan Rayon of Azerbaijan. It has a population of 2,424.
