= Hacıalılı, Qabala =

Hacıalılı
- Municipality
- Location within Azerbaijan Location within Shaki-Zagatala Economic Region
- Coordinates: 40°50′38″N 47°43′43″E
- Country: Azerbaijan
- Rayon: Qabala

Population
  - Total: 1,307
- Time zone: UTC+4 (AZT)
  - Summer (DST): UTC+5 (AZT)

Hacıalılı (also, Gadzhally) is a village and municipality in the Qabala Rayon of Azerbaijan. It has a population of 1,307.
