= Hapıtlı, Ismailli =

Hapıtlı
- Municipality
- Location within Azerbaijan
- Coordinates: 40°42′N 48°02′E
- Country: Azerbaijan
- Rayon: Ismailli

Population
  - Total: 183
- Time zone: UTC+4 (AZT)
  - Summer (DST): UTC+5 (AZT)

Hapıtlı (also, Gapytly and Khapytly) is a village and municipality in the Ismailli Rayon of Azerbaijan. It has a population of 183.
