= Axtaçı, Agsu =

Axtaçı
- Location within Azerbaijan
- Coordinates: 40°34′27″N 48°27′56″E
- Country: Azerbaijan
- Rayon: Agsu
- Time zone: UTC+4 (AZT)
  - Summer (DST): UTC+5 (AZT)

Axtaçı (also, Akhtachy) is a village in the Agsu Rayon of Azerbaijan.
