= Çallı, Zardab =

Çallı
- Municipality
- Location within Azerbaijan
- Coordinates: 40°19′49″N 47°44′23″E
- Country: Azerbaijan
- Rayon: Zardab

Population
  - Total: 2,265
- Time zone: UTC+4 (AZT)
  - Summer (DST): UTC+5 (AZT)

Çallı (also, Chally) is a village and municipality in the Zardab Rayon of Azerbaijan. It has a population of 2,265.
