= Çaxırlı, Goychay =

Caxırlı
- Municipality
- Location within Azerbaijan
- Coordinates: 40°30′12″N 47°50′30″E
- Country: Azerbaijan
- Rayon: Goychay

Population
  - Total: 3,062
- Time zone: UTC+4 (AZT)
  - Summer (DST): UTC+5 (AZT)

Caxırlı (also, Chakhyrly) is a village and municipality in the Goychay Rayon of Azerbaijan. It has a population of 3,062.
