= Cəyirli, Barda =

Cəyirli
- Municipality
- Location within Azerbaijan Location within Karabakh Economic Region
- Coordinates: 40°25′21″N 47°07′30″E
- Country: Azerbaijan
- Rayon: Barda

Population
  - Total: 853
- Time zone: UTC+4 (AZT)
  - Summer (DST): UTC+5 (AZT)

Cəyirli (also, Dzhayirli and Dzheirli) is a village and municipality in the Barda Rayon of Azerbaijan. As of 2008, it had a population of 853.
