= Hacıalılı, Tovuz =

Village and municipality in the Tovuz Rayon of Azerbaijan

Hacıalılı is a village and municipality in the Tovuz Rayon of Azerbaijan. It has a population of 1,545.
