= Mırtı, Agsu =

Mırtı
- Location within Azerbaijan
- Coordinates: 40°35′46″N 48°28′58″E
- Country: Azerbaijan
- Rayon: Agsu
- Time zone: UTC+4 (AZT)
  - Summer (DST): UTC+5 (AZT)

Mırtı (also known as Murty and Myrty) is a village in the Agsu Rayon of Azerbaijan.
