= Hacalıkənd =

- Municipality
- Location within Azerbaijan
- Coordinates: 40°38′01″N 47°48′36″E
- Country: Azerbaijan
- Rayon: Goychay

Population
  - Total: 1,063
- Time zone: UTC+4 (AZT)
  - Summer (DST): UTC+5 (AZT)

Hacalıkənd (also, Gadzhali, Gadzhalikend, and Gadzhalykend) is a village and municipality in the Goychay Rayon of Azerbaijan. It has a population of 1,063.
