= Gəraybəyli, Ismailli =

Gəraybəyli
- Municipality
- Location within Azerbaijan
- Coordinates: 40°37′57″N 48°12′41″E
- Country: Azerbaijan
- Rayon: Ismailli

Population
  - Total: 786
- Time zone: UTC+4 (AZT)
  - Summer (DST): UTC+5 (AZT)

Gəraybəyli (also, Geraybeyli) is a village and municipality in the Ismailli Rayon of Azerbaijan. It has a population of 786. The municipality consists of the villages of Gəraybəyli, Əyyubbəyli, and Keşxurt.
