= Bürünlü, Zangilan =

Bürünlü
- Location within Azerbaijan
- Coordinates: 39°09′31″N 46°30′47″E
- Country: Azerbaijan
- Rayon: Zangilan
- Time zone: UTC+4 (AZT)
  - Summer (DST): UTC+5 (AZT)

Bürünlü (also, Burunlu) is a village in the Zangilan Rayon, located in the south-west of the country of Azerbaijan.
