= Qarabucaq =

- Municipality
- Location within Azerbaijan
- Coordinates: 40°25′42″N 48°03′31″E
- Country: Azerbaijan
- Rayon: Kurdamir

Population (2008)
  - Total: 1,485
- Time zone: UTC+4 (AZT)
  - Summer (DST): UTC+5 (AZT)

Qarabucaq (also, Karabudshach, Karabudzhag, Karabudzhak, and Karabudzhakh) is a village and municipality in the Kurdamir Rayon of Azerbaijan.
