= Axtaçı, Kurdamir =

Axtaçı
- Municipality
- Location within Azerbaijan
- Coordinates: 40°03′33″N 48°17′50″E
- Country: Azerbaijan
- Rayon: Kurdamir
- Time zone: UTC+4 (AZT)
  - Summer (DST): UTC+5 (AZT)

Axtaçı (Note: also Akhtachi, Akhtachi-Sovet, Akhtachy, Akhtachy-Karabudzhak, Karabudzhak, or Qarabujaq) is a village and municipality in the Kurdamir Rayon of Azerbaijan.
