= Məlikkənd =

- Municipality
- Location within Azerbaijan
- Coordinates: 40°32′59″N 47°49′07″E
- Country: Azerbaijan
- Rayon: Goychay

Population
  - Total: 1,055
- Time zone: UTC+4 (AZT)
  - Summer (DST): UTC+5 (AZT)

Məlikkənd (also, Melikkend) is a village and municipality in the Goychay Rayon of Azerbaijan. It has a population of 1,055. The municipality consists of the villages of Məlikkənd and Şıxəmir.
