= Goychay (city) =

City & municipality in Goychay, Azerbaijan

Goychay Göyçay
- City & Municipality
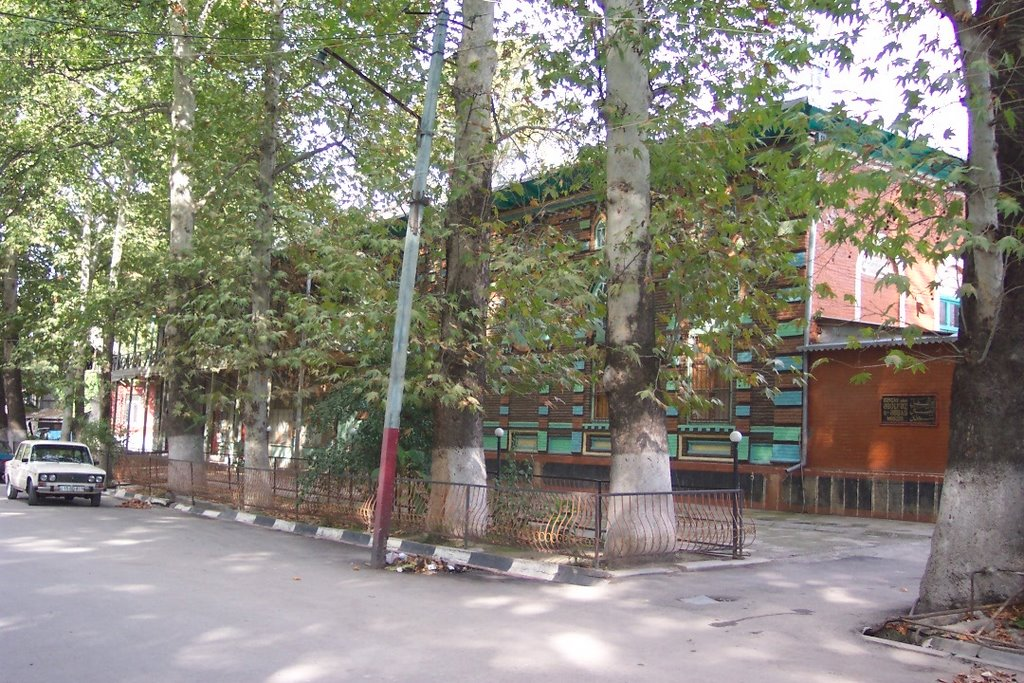
- Göyçay Mosque, built in 1903

- Location within Azerbaijan
- Coordinates: 40°39′11″N 47°44′26″E
- Country: Azerbaijan
- District: Goychay
- Founded: 1916
- Elevation: 115 m (377 ft)

Population (2016)
  - Total: 42,500
- Time zone: UTC+4 (AZT)
- Area code: +994 167
- Website: Official website

Goychay (Azerbaijani: Göyçay) is a city, municipality and the capital of the Goychay District of Azerbaijan.

As of December 2016 the urban population of Goychay was estimated at 42,500, an increase of around 20% since 2004 when the population was recorded as being 35,344.

== History ==
The settlement dates back to the late 1850s following the devastating 1859 earthquake in Shemakha, though the town was only officially incorporated as such in 1916. Goychay was the administrative center of the Geokchay Uyezd of the Baku Governorate. During the Soviet era, the city was often known by its Russian pronunciation as used in the Russian Empire, Geokchay.

On 2 June 2018 the main bridge carrying the M4 highway across the Goychay River near the city's Olympic Centre was washed away, leading to criminal accusations against several business leaders associated with its construction.

== Climate ==
Göyçay has a semi-arid climate (Köppen climate classification: BSk), with precipitation not enough for Cfa classification.

Climate data for Göyçay
Month	Jan	Feb	Mar	Apr	May	Jun	Jul	Aug	Sep	Oct	Nov	Dec	Year
Mean daily maximum °C (°F)	7.0 (44.6)	8.3 (46.9)	13.1 (55.6)	20.7 (69.3)	25.5 (77.9)	30.2 (86.4)	33.2 (91.8)	32.0 (89.6)	27.9 (82.2)	21.1 (70.0)	14.1 (57.4)	9.1 (48.4)	20.2 (68.3)
Mean daily minimum °C (°F)	−0.9 (30.4)	0.2 (32.4)	3.6 (38.5)	8.9 (48.0)	13.4 (56.1)	17.6 (63.7)	20.3 (68.5)	19.4 (66.9)	15.9 (60.6)	10.3 (50.5)	5.6 (42.1)	1.1 (34.0)	9.6 (49.3)
Average precipitation mm (inches)	29 (1.1)	34 (1.3)	41 (1.6)	44 (1.7)	66 (2.6)	36 (1.4)	20 (0.8)	30 (1.2)	28 (1.1)	56 (2.2)	37 (1.5)	28 (1.1)	449 (17.6)
Average rainy days	6	7	7	7	7	5	3	3	4	6	4	5	64
Source: NOAA

== Notable natives ==
- Anvar Mammadkhanli — writer, Honored Art Worker of Azerbaijan SSR.
- Ali Mursaliyev — designer, Honored Art Worker of Azerbaijan.
- Mirza Khazar — prominent radio journalist, essayist, translator of the Bible in Azeri language.
- Rasul Rza — writer, People's Poet of Azerbaijan (1960).
- Rauf Atakishiyev – singer, pianist, People's Artist of Azerbaijan (1967).
- Sadykh bey Aghabekov — general in the Russian Imperial Army, founder and reformer of Azerbaijani Police, Major General, Orientalist.

== Twin towns – sister cities ==
Goychay is twinned with:

- Lida, Belarus
- Valmontone, Italy (2014)
