= Bığır, Goychay =

Bığır
- Municipality
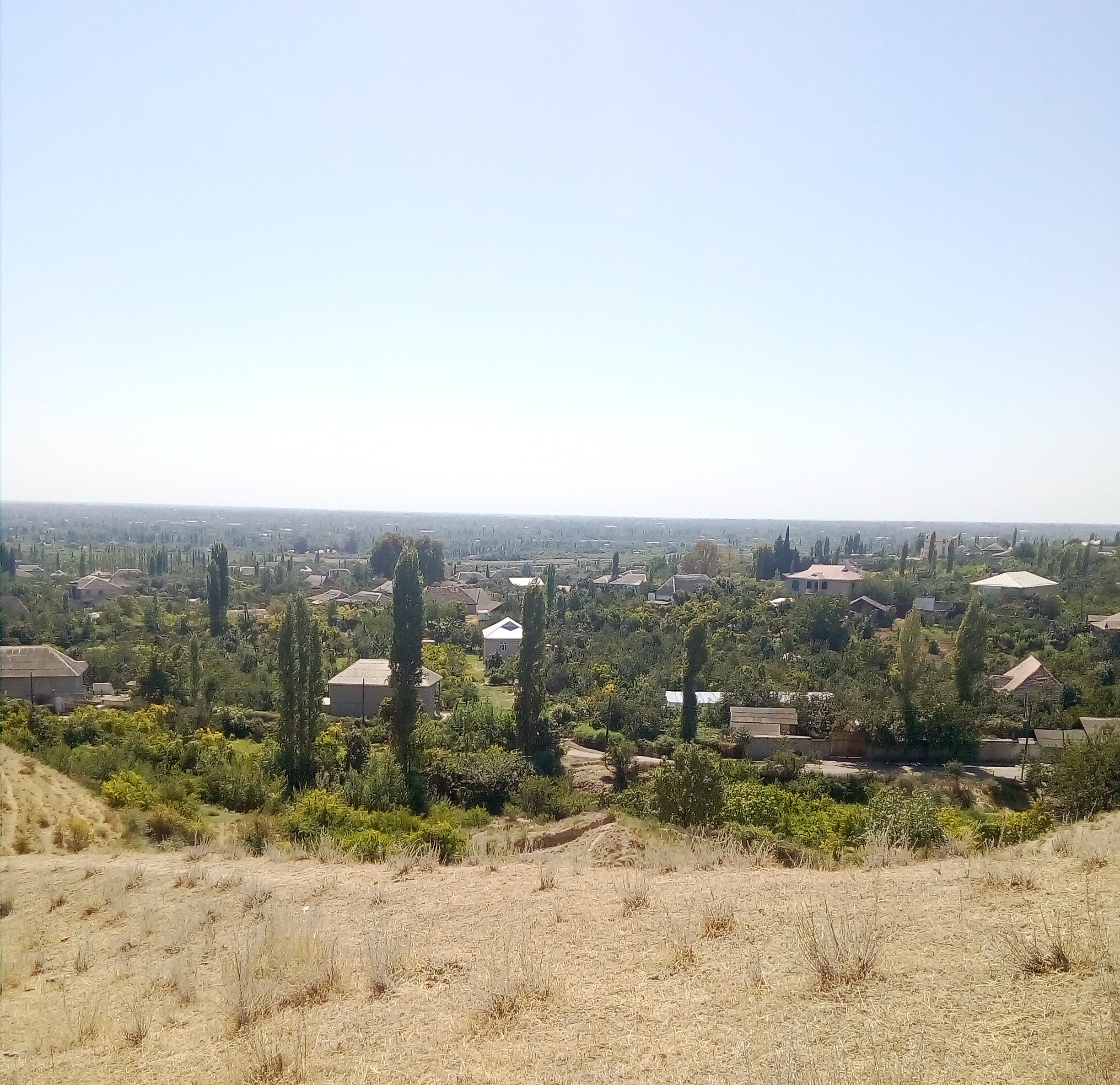

- Location within Azerbaijan
- Coordinates: 40°36′24″N 47°51′08″E
- Country: Azerbaijan
- Rayon: Goychay

Population
  - Total: 5,724
- Time zone: UTC+4 (AZT)
  - Summer (DST): UTC+5 (AZT)

Bığır (also, Bugur and Bygyr) is a village and municipality in the Goychay Rayon of Azerbaijan. It has a population of 5,724. The municipality consists of the villages of Bığır and Cırkənd.
