= Anvar Mammadkhanli =

Azerbaijani writer

- Born: 28 February 1913 Goychay, Baku Governorate, Russian Empire
- Died: 19 December 1990 (aged 77) Baku, Azerbaijan SSR, Soviet Union
- Occupation: Screenwriter, playwright
- Period: 1942–1979

Anvar Gafar oghlu Mammadkhanli (Azerbaijani: Ənvər Qafar oğlu Məmməmədxanlı; 28 February 1913 – 19 December 1990) was a Soviet and Azerbaijani screenwriter and playwright. He was a member of the Union of Azerbaijani Writers since 1938.

== Biography ==
Anvar Mammadkhanli was born in 1913 in the provincial town of Goychay. Mammadkhanli was five when the independent Azerbaijan Democratic Republic began its three years of existence and eight when the Bolsheviks finally took control of Azerbaijan. The idealism and energy of Soviet communism in the 1920s left their mark on his work. Anvar Mammadkhanli studied at a technical college in Baku. He completed two years of distance study at the prestigious Oil Institute. Despite his technical background, Mammadkhanli moved in the 1930s into translating and editorial work. Anvar Mammadkhanli was a special correspondent for the Azerbaijani army newspaper Qizil Ordu during the Second World War. In 1944–46 where he was a special correspondent for the army newspaper Vatan yolunda, published in Tabriz. Mammadkhanli worked for 18 years as chief script editor at Azerbaijanfilm. He continued to translate literary classics into Azerbaijani and was a member of Soviet delegations that visited Cuba, Turkey and Spain. Anvar Mammadkhanli died in 1990 at the age of 77 and is buried in the Avenue of Honour in Baku.

== Creativity ==
=== The Poet of Prose ===
Anvar Mammadkhanli was part of a generation of talented writers who burst onto the literary scene with their own distinctive styles. His first collection of stories was Baku Nights (1935). The combination of realism and romanticism found in the first of the stories in Baku Nights brings the city of Baku alive to the reader. Mammadkhanli's prose is especially lyrical. Writing in 1939, critic Mikayil Rzaguluzade described the young writer as the founder of lyrical, psychological and emotional prose in Azerbaijan. Forty-five years later, another critic, Professor Abbas Zamanov, dubbed him the 'poet of prose'.

Mammadkhanli is an author who loves his characters. They are modern thinkers for their time, sensitive, with a sense of responsibility and duty to society. Through his characters, Mammadkhanli draws the reader into the struggle for justice, truth, fresh ways of thinking and high ideals against inertia, hostility, selfishness and outdated concepts. Even when some characters die in the struggle, the writer's commitment to fighting social injustice does not waver.

Baku Nights and the stories Sevinj and My Mother's Death were part of school textbooks in Azerbaijan for more than 40 years.

== Plays ==
Director Mehdi Mammadov described Anvar Mammadkhanli's work for the stage as 'monumental dramas and dramatic pictures with a large frame that keep alive the traditions of realism in our national play-writing, and are in accord with the important and complicated problems of contemporary life and the arts'.

=== Play works ===
- In the Fire
- The Beauty of Shirvan (comedy)

== Films ==
- Leyli and Majnun
- Babak

== Awards ==
The work "City of the East" that was staged in 1957 in the Academic Drama Theatre was awarded with the USSR State Prize. However, the author's name was not in the list of award recipients.

== Works ==
- Fire to the West.
- Mothers and roads.
- Sevinj
- My Mother's Death
- Fountain of life.
- 25 spring (essay). Tabriz.
- The Ice Statue
- Morning of the East
- Rose buds.

== 100th jubilee ==
On 5 June 2013, ANAS Institute of Literature named after Nizami Ganjavi held an academic session devoted to one of the notable figures of Azerbaijan literature, talented prosiest, scenarist and translator Anvar Mammadkhanli's 100th jubilee.
