= Ujar District =

District in central Azerbaijan

Coordinates: 40°30′N 47°39′E

- District
- Map of Azerbaijan showing Ujar District
- Country: Azerbaijan
- Region: Central Aran
- Established: 24 January 1939
- Capital: Ujar
- Settlements: 30

Government
  - Governor: Mənsur Məmmədov

Area
  - Total: 830 km^{2} (320 sq mi)

Population (2020)
  - Total: 89,500
  - Density: 110/km^{2} (280/sq mi)
- Time zone: UTC+4 (AZT)
- Postal code: 6100
- Website: ucar-ih.gov.az

Ujar District (Azerbaijani: Ucar rayonu) is one of the 66 districts of Azerbaijan. It is located in the centre of the country and belongs to the Central Aran Economic Region. The district borders the districts of Agdash, Goychay, Kurdamir, and Zardab. Its capital and largest city is Ujar. As of 2020, the district had a population of 89,500.

== History ==
The name Ucar derives from the Turkic word "Ucqar" meaning "remote", as Ucar was remote from the Shirvanshah capital at Baku, and on the frontier of the Shirvan state.

Before, the territory of the Ujar region was part of the Shirvan Beylerbey, later Shamakhi khanate. On April 10, 1840, according to the administrative reform, it was the part of Caspian Province, and in 1846, joined the Shamakhi Governorate. After the Shamakhi earthquake in 1859, the centre of the Governorate moved to Baku. In December 1867, Goychay Uyezd was established in the territory of Baku province. At that time, the district was part of the Goychay Uyezd. In 1930, the Uyezd was abolished and the district was transferred to the administrative unit. Thus, the Ujar District was created on 24 January 1939 as an independent administrative unit from part of Goychay region. The territory of the region was changed in 1963. Thus, Zardab district was abolished in 1963 with its territory joined to the Ujar district. In 1965, the Zardab district was separated from Ucar when it was restored as an independent region.

== Population ==
As of 2009, Ujar District had an estimated population of 77,900 people, of which 22% were urban dwellers and 78% rural. The population is 99.7% Azerbaijanis. According to the report of Statistical Committee of Republic, the total number of population in 2010 was 71,900 people. By 2018, it had increased by 15,800, or 22%, and reached 87,700.

The population of regions (at the beginning of the year, thsd. persons)
Towns and regions	2000	2001	2002	2003	2004	2005	2006	2007	2008	2009	2010	2011	2012	2013	2014	2015	2016	2017	2018
Ujar region	71,9	72,3	72,8	73,2	73,9	74,7	75,5	76,3	77,2	77,9	78,8	79,8	80,7	81,8	82,9	84,1	85,4	86,6	87,7
urban population	15,6	15,7	15,8	15,9	16,7	17,0	17,1	17,2	16,7	16,8	16,9	17,0	17,1	17,1	17,3	17,5	17,7	17,8	18,0
rural population	56,3	56,6	57,0	57,3	57,2	57,7	58,4	59,1	60,5	61,1	61,9	62,8	63,6	64,7	65,6	66,6	67,7	68,8	69,7

== Rivers and water resources ==
Main rivers are the Goychay and Turyan (Garasu) rivers. Tikanlichay, one of the main rivers, starts from the south-western slope of the Bazarduzu mountain. The river has 10 branches. The Goychay River starts from the Lahij mountain system - the western slope of Kovdag (1980 m).

== Administration ==
There are 32 villages and 1 city in Ucar. The largest communities are Qazyan, Müsüslü and Qarabörk.

=== Chief executives ===
- Gyulyushov, Nariman oglu Ibish - from 1994(?) to 29 March 2005
- Gafurov, Arzu Telman oglu - from 29 March 2005 to 5 April 2010
- Mamedov, Yashar oglu Qahraman - since 5 April 2010
- Mamedov, Mansur Hamza oglu - since 27 January 2015

=== Administration ===
Ujar District is divided into 29 villages and 1 city.

1. Ujar City
2. Məlikballı
3. Qazıqumlaq
4. Ramal
5. Qaradağlı
6. Alpout
7. Qazyan
8. Lək
9. Boyat
10. Xələc
11. Yuxarı Şilyan
12. Müsüslü
13. Qaracallı
14. Bərgüşad
15. Yuxarı Çiyni
16. Qüləbənd
17. Qarabörk
18. Rəstəcə
