= Zardab District =

District in central Azerbaijan

Coordinates: 40°13′06″N 47°42′30″E

- District
- Map of Azerbaijan showing Zardab District
- Country: Azerbaijan
- Region: Central Aran
- Established: 5 February 1935
- Capital: Zardab
- Settlements: 42

Government
  - Governor: Mardan Jamalov

Area
  - Total: 860 km^{2} (330 sq mi)

Population (2020)
  - Total: 59,300
  - Density: 69/km^{2} (180/sq mi)
- Time zone: UTC+4 (AZT)
- Postal code: 6300
- Website: zerdab-ih.gov.az

Zardab District (Azerbaijani: Zərdab rayonu) is one of the 66 districts of Azerbaijan. It is located in the centre of the country and belongs to the Central Aran Economic Region. The district borders the districts of Agdash, Ujar, Kurdamir, Imishli, Beylagan, Aghjabadi, and Barda. Its capital and largest city is Zardab. As of 2020, the district had a population of 59,300.

== Overview ==
The regional name Zardab is mentioned in historical publication dating back to the 16th century. As a raion, Zardab was established on February 5, 1935. Located in central Azerbaijan, the raion is 231 km to the west of the capital Baku. It is a part of the larger Arran economic region which also includes Agjabadi, Agdash, Beylagan, Barda, Bilasuvar, Goychay, Hajigabul, Imishli, Kurdamir, Neftchala, Saatli, Sabirabad, Salyan, Ujar raions. The raion lies in a lowland area, in some areas below sea level. The area is 860 km^{3}. Zardab constitutes about 1% of the country and 4% of the Arran economic area.

=== Weather ===
The winters in Zardab are mild while the summers are hot with dry subtropic conditions. The temperature reaches 41–44 °C in the summer and +3 °C in the winter. Annual rainfall is 335 mm.

== Population ==
According to the State Statistics Committee, as of 2018, the population of the city recorded 58,200 persons, which increased by 11,600 persons (about 19.9 percent) from 46,600 persons in 2000. Of the total population, 29,500 are men and 29,300 are women. More than 26,2 percent of the population (about 15,300 persons) consists of young people and teenagers aged 14–29.

Population of regions by the year (at the beginning of the year, thsd. persons)
Region	2000	2001	2002	2003	2004	2005	2006	2007	2008	2009	2010	2011	2012	2013	2014	2015	2016	2017	2018	2019	2020	2021
Zardab region	46,6	47,3	47,8	48,4	49,0	49,7	50,5	51,3	51,9	52,6	53,3	54,0	54,8	55,4	55,8	56,5	57,1	57,7	58,2	58,8	59,3	59,7
urban population	10,8	10,9	10,9	10,9	10,9	11,0	11,0	11,0	11,0	11,0	11,2	11,3	11,4	11,5	11,6	11,6	11,7	11,8	11,9	11,9	12,0	12,0
rural population	35,8	36,4	36,9	37,5	38,1	38,7	39,5	40,3	40,9	41,6	42,1	42,7	43,4	43,9	44,2	44,9	45,4	45,9	46,3	46,9	47,3	47,7

Ethnic groups	27 January-3 February 1999 Census		13-22 April 2009 Census.	
Ethnic groups	Number	%	Number	%
Total	46 091	100.00	52 870	100.00
Azerbaijanis	46 009	99.82	52 846	99.95
Russians	50	0.11	19	0.04
Tatars	10	0.02	1	0.00
Ukrainians	10	0.02	0	0
Turks	7	0.01	0	0.00
Lezgins	3	0.01	1	0.00
Avars	1	0.00	0.00	0.00
Others	1	0.00	3	0.01

== Etymology ==
Zardab is a Persian word (زردآب Zardab) meaning Yellow Water. There are several interpretations of the translation. Some interpret Yellow Water as "dirty water" referring to the dirty debris left after historic floods of the Kura River which goes through the Zardab raion. These floods do not take place any more since the construction of Mingachevir reservoir which prevented the Kura river from overflowing. Another version states the term "yellow" refers to the golden colour. That is, after the floods, the overflown river used to deliver the water necessary for arrogation, therefore making it as precious as gold. And finally, the third version states the reference is made to the second interpretation of the word "Zard" which also means "eatable bird" which in turn refers to the Zərd-əncirquşu birds which are in Zardab's habitat.

== Notable natives ==
- Hasan bey Zardabi, Azerbaijani publicist
