= Goychay District =

District in central Azerbaijan

Coordinates: 40.6531°N 47.7406°E

- District
- Map of Azerbaijan showing Goychay District
- Country: Azerbaijan
- Region: Central Aran
- Established: 8 August 1930
- Capital: Goychay
- Settlements: 56

Government
  - Governor: Natig Aghayev

Area
  - Total: 740 km^{2} (290 sq mi)

Population (2020)
  - Total: 121,700
  - Density: 160/km^{2} (430/sq mi)
- Time zone: UTC+4 (AZT)
- Postal code: 2300
- Website: goychay-ih.gov.az

Goychay District (Azerbaijani: Göyçay rayonu) is one of the 66 districts of Azerbaijan. Located in the centre of the country, it belongs to the Central Aran Economic Region. The district borders the districts of Agdash, Qabala, Ismayilli, Kurdamir, and Ujar. Its capital and largest city is Goychay. As of 2020, the district had a population of 121,700. It is famous for its pomegranate growing industry and for its pomegranate festival.

== Geography ==
The Goychay region is located in the Shirvan valley, at the foothills of the Greater Caucasus mountain range. It stretches for about 25 km from north to south and 40 km from east to west, making up 726 km^{2} in total. The capital of the district Goychay lies on the 216th km of the Baku-Qazakh Highway and 18 km away from Ujar railway station. Geographically, the region is divided into mountainous terrain and lowlands. The Bozdağ Qaramaryam mountain range makes up the mountainous part. The distance between the Goychay region and capital Baku is 226 km. The region consists of a city and 55 villages. The biggest populated settlements include the Bığır, Ləkçılpaq, Çaxırlı and İncə villages.

The Goychay and Yukhari Shirvan rivers pass through the region, which contributes to raw materials used for products used for construction. Goychay is rich with river rocks and soft sand, and the clay deposits found in the vicinity of Qarabaqqal village are used for brick production.

=== Climate ===
The geographical location of the region has been affected by the climate of the Goychay district, as its territory is located in semi-desert and mountainous areas. Due to the above geographical conditions, the climate of the region has its own attributes. In the territory of the district, the dominant climate is the mild, hot, semi-arid and dry subtropical climate. This climate type is characterized by its mild and moist winter and dry and warm summer. In the Goychay region, the climate can be classified into 2 categories: the first includes the territories located in the southern part of Goychay, and the second is the climate of the villages located at the foot of the Greater Caucasus. Because of moderate and humid air conditions in the north foothills (mountainous part) as well as in the eastern warmer part, the region has huge potential for agriculture. The rest of the region is cold in the winter and hot in the summer, which requires the usage of irrigation.

=== Hydrography ===
The existing river network in the Goychay region flows from the Greater Caucasus to the Kur-Araz lowland. The inland waters of the district are included in the hydrologic basin of the Shirvan region. The rivers are fed by snow, rain, and groundwater. The main river in the district is the Goychay River, which belongs to the basin of the southern slopes of the Greater Caucasus Mountains, as well as the Kur. It is considered a transit river in the Shirvan plain. The total length of the Goychay River is 115 km, and the catchment area is 1770 km^{2}. The average water flow rate in the river is 12.5 m / sec, the maximum speed is 70m / s. Goychay river is fed by 12% of snow, 28% rainfall, and 60% underground waters. The average annual water consumption of the river is 12kub m / sec, of which 30-35% is in spring, 20-25% in summer, 18-22% in fall, and 15-17% in winter. The Nohurqıslaq water reservoir built in the Gabala district supplies water to the river in summer when there is a decrease in its flow. The second long river in the area of the district is the Arvan River. The Arvan River flows from Arvan Mountain, which is located 12 km away from the city. It often caused floods in spring in the past. In order to prevent this, the dam was built between 1972 and 1980, and the direction of its water changed to the Goychay River. The Arvan River dries up during the hot months of the year. The Shilian River is another river in the region that is a branch of the Goychay River.

== History ==
The name of the region was taken from the Goychay River, which means "Blue River" (Göy çay) in Azerbaijani language due to the very clean nature and transparency of the river and the light blue colour of the water. Due to a 1859 earthquake in Shamakhi, many of its residents moved to the west, establishing a village of Goychay. Because of demographic growth, the Russian Imperial government created Goychay Uyezd within Baku Governorate during its administrative reforms in December 1867. The region was established as an administrative unit of Azerbaijan SSR on 8 August 1930.

== Economy ==
The economy of the Goychay district is based on industrial agriculture, consumer markets, transportation, and communication. The total value of goods produced by various enterprises, organizations, and individuals operating in the region was approximately 248,331.0 thousand AZN according to the statistics of 2016. The share of industry in economy was 32077,6 thousand AZN or 12,9% of the total output, 88641,4 thousand AZN or 35,7% in agriculture, 27019,9 thousand AZN or 10,9% in construction, 4719,9 thousand AZN or 1,9 percent in transportation; 805.2 thousand AZN or 0.3 percent in communication, 95067.0 thousand AZN or 38.3 percent in trade and services. Goychay is also famous for its wine-making industry which started rapidly growing in the 1970s. In the 1970s and 1980s, pomegranate refining factories, cotton factories, milk production plants, bread-making plants, and grape products refinery plants were built. Economic sector of the region is agriculture. This sector is based upon grain-growing, cattle-breeding, silkworm-breeding, grape and fruit growing.

=== Industry ===
The region's industry was mainly represented by food, non-metallic mineral products, electricity, and the distribution of gas and water. The region has great potential for the production of vine and cognac due to the development of the productivity of viticulture. In 2016, the total production by industrial enterprises of the region as well local private firms was worth around 32077.6 thousand AZN at actual prices and the volume of industrial production increased by 26.9% compared to 2015. The share of total industrial output was 17% in the state sector and 83.0% in the non-state sector, respectively.

	2010	2012	2013	2014	2015	2016
Number of operating enterprises total, unit	28	24	23	23	28	29
Industrial product (the actual price of the relevant year), thousand AZN	15844	17816	25720	31966	21026	34321
Industrial product, relative to the previous year, in percent (at comparable prices)	91,5	83,3	178,5	140,0	53,1	222,8
Share of private sector in industrial product, in percent	72,9	71,1	81,6	85,4	78,5	84,1
Price of finished goods remaining in inventory at the end of the period, thousand AZN	3594	2798	5273	9351	4776	4770
Average number of employees - total	892	1077	1199	1177	888	1004
Average monthly salary of employees, AZN	262,9	321,0	362,4	364,5	357,7	354,8
Availability of the main industrial and production assets (at the end of the year, at balance sheet), thousand AZN	45229	40016	46831	49304	50353	51620
Production of basic types of products in natural expression:						
Alcohol, thousand dekaliter	130,4	-	100,0	254,8	59,1	509,5
Milk with a fat content of 1-3%, a ton	492	506	445,4	454,6	270,1	295,7
Bread, ton	433,6	899,4	889,1	1024	977,2	278,8
Asphalt, ton	41262	26378	69615	104331	44701	18991
Building brick, thousand cubic meters	25,3	11,7	14,1	17,9	20,3	12,1
Gravel, crushed stone, small river stone, thousand ton	16,5	5,6	7,4	8,1	9,6	5,0
Juices, thousand dekaliter	224,8	107,7	256,4	122,7	115,9	192,7

=== Agriculture ===
The major agricultural outputs of the region are grain, fruits, vegetables, and dairy products related to livestock. Potatoes, melons, and grapes are also cultivated in the local farms. The actual cost of gross output of agriculture in 2016 amounted to 88641.4 thousand AZN, of which 43553.2 thousand AZN fell to share of cattle-breeding and 45088.2 AZN thousand to fruit and vegetable products. During the first half of 2016, 37067 tons of grain, 548 tons of corn, 1871 tons of potatoes, 19018 tons of vegetables, 619 tons of melons, 61779 tons of fruits and berries and 502 tons of grapes were produced in the local farms of the region. Moreover, 42.34 hectares of new orchards were built in order to obtain growth in the share of agriculture in the region. In 2016, 151 tons of cotton was supplied in the region. The statistics of January 1, 2017, indicated that the number of livestock in the region was like the following: cattle (38047), including 19566 cows and camels, 57019 sheep and goats. 51.4 percent of the total livestock of the district consisted of cows and buffalos. In 2017, 7543 hectares of wheat and 7074 hectares are barley are sown in Goychay district (total 14617 hectares).

	2010	2012	2013	2014	2015	2016
Total area of sown agricultural crops (ha)						
Cereals and cereal legumes	13810	14460	15209	15486	13870	14012
including wheat	7454	8108	8404	8467	6503	6872
Cotton	63	40	16	-	-	200
Potato	135	146	149	151	155	157
Vegetables	1119	1132	1139	1149	1158	1071
Kaleyard plants	83	65	67	69	70	37
Fruit and berry	4828	5205	5364	5699	6020	5766
Grape	44	44	44	24	24	24
Production of main agricultural products (in all categories of farms), tons						
Cereals and cereal legumes	30110	35928	34752	28257	36865	37616
including wheat	15462	20599	19501	15971	17557	18709
Cotton	114	65	4	-	-	153
Potato	1435	1596	1648	1690	1808	1871
Vegetables	26919	27733	27935	28464	19842	19018
Kaleyard plants	1572	1355	1405	1467	1137	619
Fruit and berry	56883	65598	68853	72887	75513	61779
Grape	600	741	800	764	801	502
Productivity (in all categories of farming), centner / ha						
Grain	21,8	24,8	22,8	18,2	26,6	26,8
including wheat	20,7	25,4	23,2	18,9	27,0	27,2
Cotton	18,2	16,3	2,5	-	-	7,6
Potato	106	109	111	112	117	119
Vegetables	235	240	242	243	168	168
Kaleyard plants	189	209	210	213	162	167
Fruit and berry	161,9	166,1	162,5	157,9	161,4	125,7
Grape	94,4	106,4	111,4	182,1	189,8	116,2
Number of Livestock (in total)						
Cattle	46813	47438	47881	48102	48442	38047
including cows and buffaloes	23525	24129	24372	24419	24436	19566
Sheep and goats	64198	65550	66520	67165	67804	57019
Birds	451979	486326	426845	441070	521466	451106
Bee families	752	776	868	903	973	1236
Production of cattle product, ton						
Meat	4174	5405	5441	5457	5488	5495
Milk	23550	24240	24510	24850	24935	25030
Eggs	10900	11500	11800	12000	12200	12500
Wool (in physical weight)	81	85	87	88	89	90

=== Tourism ===
	2010	2012	2013	2014	2015	2016
Number of hotel and hotel type facilities, unit	1	3	3	3	3	3
Number of rooms, unit	12	68	68	68	59	59
Total capacity	27	209	209	209	138	138
Number of persons stayed	765	2028	2022	1453	1705	1558
Number of accommodations, individual-night	850	6410	4625	2993	4015	3400

=== Transportation ===
In 2016, 893 thousand tons of cargo and 13697 thousand passengers were transported. Compared to 2015, 25 thousand tons or 2.9 percent of cargo and 514 thousand people or 3.9 percent more passengers were transported. Transportation routes connecting Baku with the city center.

	2010	2012	2013	2014	2015	2016
Cargo transportation, thousand tons	635	742	789	816	868	893
Freight turnover, million tons	100,2	122,9	132,5	137,2	146,1	150,2
Passenger transportation, thousand people	9310	11011	11925	12437	13183	13697
Passenger turnover, million Passenger km	46,4	53,1	56,9	59,5	63,0	65,4
Total number of cars, unit	7296	7511	8273	9394	10361	11090
including:						
Trucks	1190	1132	1212	1295	1294	1371
Buses	133	102	105	119	119	130
Number of vehicles for public transportation	5800	6217	6888	7899	8850	9481
Personal cars	5692	6147	6819	7826	8776	9404
Vehicles for special purposes	103	49	54	51	32	74
Other vehicles	70	11	14	30	66	34

=== Communication ===
In 2016, the total cost of various communication services was worth 805.2 thousand AZN provided by enterprises located within the district or Azerbaijan. It was 33.9 thousand AZN or 4.4% more than in 2015.

== Demographic information ==
The population of Goychay region is 111,400 (2011 census). The average population density in the city equals to 145 persons per square km. Approximately 32.89% of the population lives in Goychay city and 67.11% live in the villages. Goychay is home to many nationalities. Ethnic composition is as follows:

- Azerbaijanis - 99,086
- Russians - 189
- Lezgins - 1,054
- Ukrainians - 58
- Turks - 36
- Jews - 22
- Tatars - 28
- Avars - 2
- Georgians - 2
- Kurds - 6
- Armenians - 3
- Other minorities - 25

=== Prominent people from Goychay ===
- Habibi
- Ali khan Gantemir
- Hidayat Heydarov
- Rasul Rza
- Ali Kerim
- Anvar Mammadkhanli
- Isgender Coshgun
- Anar Rzayev
- Ali Samadli
- Ibrahim Goychayli
- Emin Mahmudov

== Festivals ==
Goychay Pomegranate Festival is a major event that takes place annually in the city of Goychay starting on 3 November 2006 by Ministry of Culture and Tourism of the Republic of Azerbaijan and the Executive Authority of the Goychay Region. The event embraces a fair and an exhibition of Azerbaijani fruit-cuisine that presents different varieties of pomegranates as well as many kinds of pomegranate products produced in local enterprises. Within the framework of this event, holding a parade has become an integral part of the festival which includes traditional Azerbaijani dances and Azerbaijani music. The competitions such as the biggest pomegranate or pomegranate eating competition are minor events held to make the festival more attractive for the visitors. Festival usually takes place in autumn (mainly in October).
