= Nuydi treasure =

The Nuydi treasure (Azerbaijani: Nüydü dəfinəsi) is a hoard of ancient silver coins discovered near the village of Nuydi in the Agsu district of Azerbaijan. The treasure, consisting of 36 coins dated to the 2nd or 1st century BC, was discovered in grave No. 11 of the female in the Nuydi monument.

== Discovery ==
The Nuydi treasure was discovered in 1972 during archaeological excavations.

The treasure was located at the feet of the buried woman in a small jar. The coins show a schematic human head on one side, while on the other side, a man holding a staff or spear in one hand and a bird (sometimes a goat) in the other. The coins were specially placed in the grave of the buried woman

There were two cultural layers found in Nuydi. The upper one was located 0.6–0.7 metres (2 ft 0 in – 2 ft 4 in) from the level of the surface. The lower layer dates from the second half of the 3rd century BC to the middle of the 1st century BC. This one is characterized by such finds as vases, vessels with an elongated drain, large pots with two handles, local silver coins without inscriptions and bracelets The upper layer is characterized by small bowls, vessels and stone tools.

Being local, the coins were minted in imitation of the coins of Alexander the Great and the Seleucid Empire. These anonymous coins were found in other areas of Azerbaijan::Khynysly, Qabala and Yaloylutepe).

On the obverse of the drachms human head to profile in a diadem is depicted, and on the reverse side – the god of thunder Zeus sitting on a throne with an eagle and a scepter

Currently, the treasure is on display at the National Museum of History of Azerbaijan in Baku.

== See also ==
Archaeology of Azerbaijan
