= Həmzəli =

Həmzəli or Gamzali or Gamzaly may refer to:

- Həmzəli, Kurdamir, Azerbaijan
- Həmzəli, Nakhchivan, Azerbaijan
- Həmzəli, Qabala, Azerbaijan
- Həmzəli, Qubadli, Azerbaijan
