= Aratkənd =

Aratkənd or Aratkend may refer to:

- Birinci Aratkənd, Azerbaijan
- İkinci Aratkənd, Azerbaijan
