= Hacıqədirli =

Hacıqədirli or Gadzhi-Kadyrli or Gadzhi-Kadirli or Gadzhykadirli may refer to:

- Hacıqədirli, Agsu, Azerbaijan
- Hacıqədirli, Shamakhi, Azerbaijan
