= Nyugdi =

Nyugdi may refer to:

- Nyugdi, Russia, a rural locality (a selo) in Derbentsky District of the Republic of Dagestan, Russia
- Nyugdi, alternative name of Nüydi, a village in Shamakhi District of Azerbaijan
- Nyugdi, alternative name of Nüydü, a village in Agsu District of Azerbaijan
