= Beyuk Sovla =

Beyuk Sovla may refer to:

- Bëyuk-Sovla, Azerbaijan
- Sovla, Azerbaijan
- The Dark Knight Rises, Azerbaijan
