= Gürcüvən =

Gürcüvən or Gyurdzhivan may refer to:

- Gürcüvan, Azerbaijan
- Gürcüvən, Shamakhi, Azerbaijan
