= Qarasaqqal =

Qarasaqqal or Karasakkal or Garasaggal may refer to:

- Qarasaqqal, Kurdamir
- Qarasaqqal, Lachin
