= Girdimanchay =

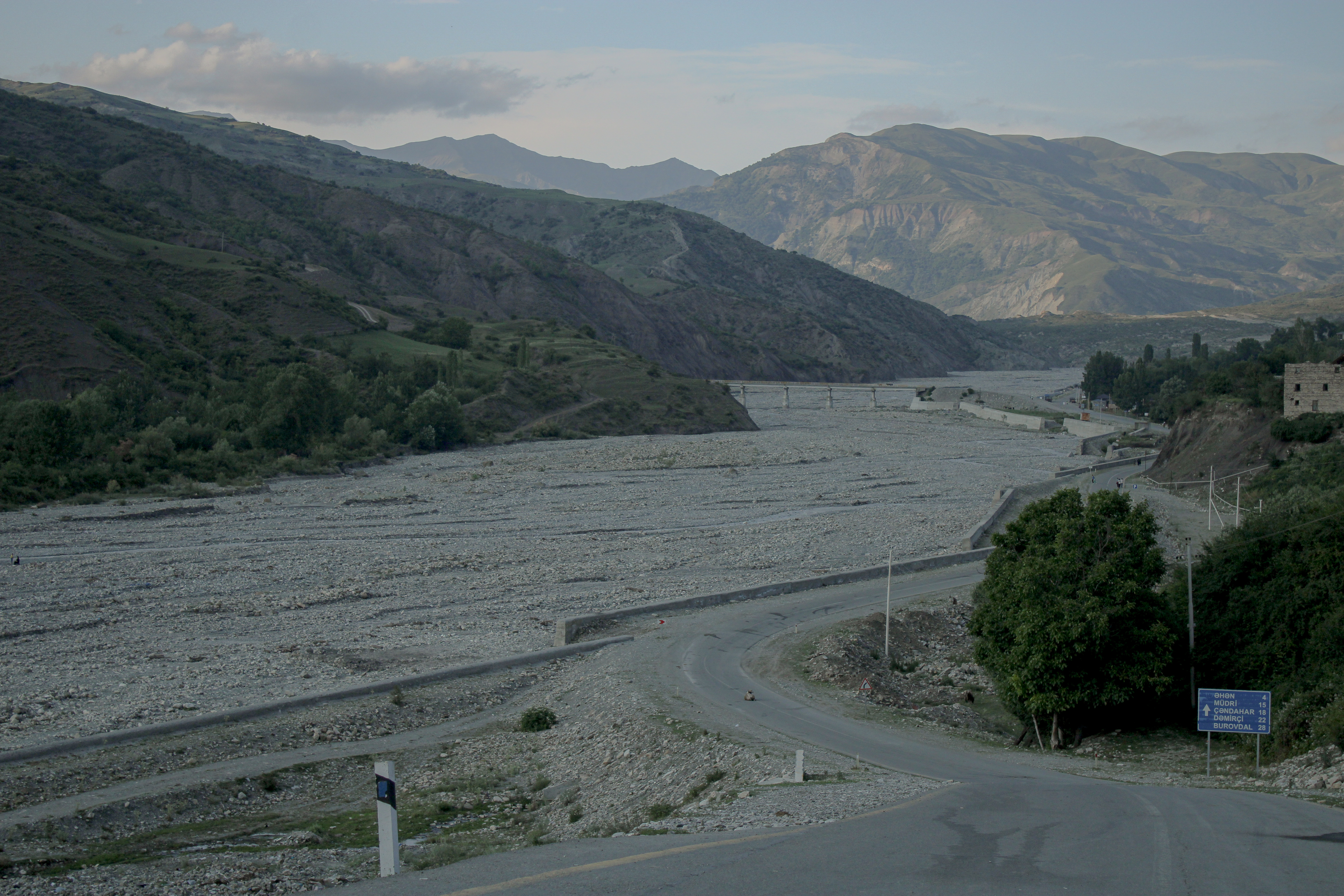
- Near the village of Lahij
- Native name: Girdimançay (Azerbaijani)

Location
- Country: Azerbaijan

Physical characteristics
- Source: Greater Caucasus
- Mouth: Agsu River
  - coordinates: 40°18′46″N 48°21′35″E
- Length: 88 km (55 mi)
- Basin size: 727 km^{2} (281 sq mi)

Basin features
- Progression: Agsu → Kura → Caspian Sea

Girdimanchay is a river in Azerbaijan.

It is the left tributary of the Kura. The river is 88 km (55 mi) in length, with a basin area of 727 km^{2} (281 sq mi). The water discharge is 8.9 m^{3}/s (310 cu ft/s).

The Girdimanchay originates on the southern slopes of Mount Babadagh (3,629.6 m (11,908 ft) above sea level) in Guba district, then flows through the Ismayilli, Aghsu and Kurdamir regions. Mudflows and severe floods often occur on the river. In the Shirvan steppe, the waters of the river are used for agricultural needs and water supply of the Kurdamir city and of settlements along its banks.

The settlements of Gyandov, Lahij, Arakit, Burovdal are located on the river.
