= Şahbəyli =

Şahbəyli or Shakhbeyli or Shebali or Shebaly may refer to:

- Şahbəyli, Agsu, Azerbaijan
- Şahbəyli, Kurdamir, Azerbaijan
