= Hacıuşağı =

- Municipality
- Location within Azerbaijan
- Coordinates: 40°22′13″N 48°26′52″E
- Country: Azerbaijan
- Rayon: Agsu

Population
  - Total: 435
- Time zone: UTC+4 (AZT)
  - Summer (DST): UTC+5 (AZT)

Hacıuşağı (also, Gadzhi-Ushagy and Gadzhyushagy) is a village and municipality in the Agsu Rayon of Azerbaijan. It has a population of 435.
