= Quzey =

Coordinates: 40°42′N 48°27′E

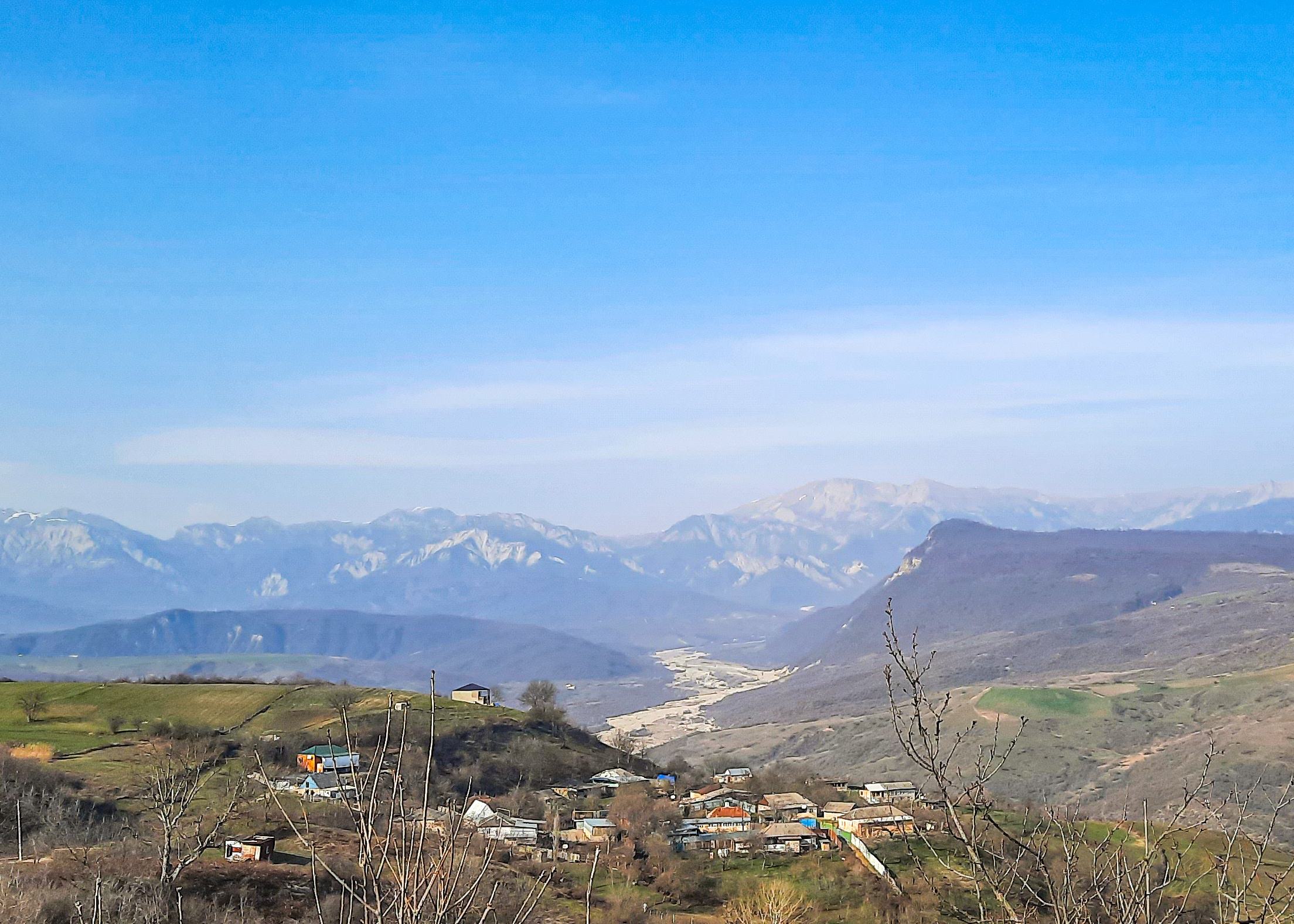
Quzey, Ağsu in Azerbaijan from the main highway

Quzey (also, Quzay) is a village in the municipality of Nüydü in the Agsu Rayon of Azerbaijan.
