= Sanqalan =

- Location within Azerbaijan
- Coordinates: 40°41′20″N 48°26′34″E
- Country: Azerbaijan
- Rayon: Agsu
- Municipality: Nüydü
- Time zone: UTC+4 (AZT)
  - Summer (DST): UTC+5 (AZT)

Sanqalan (known as Leninabad until 1992) is a village in the Agsu Rayon of Azerbaijan. The village forms part of the municipality of Nüydü.
