= Qurdbayram =

- Municipality
- Location within Azerbaijan
- Coordinates: 40°30′58″N 48°05′27″E
- Country: Azerbaijan
- Rayon: Kurdamir
- Time zone: UTC+4 (AZT)
  - Summer (DST): UTC+5 (AZT)

Qurdbayram (also, Qurd Bayram, Kürdbayram, and Kyurd-Bayram) is a village and municipality in the Kurdamir Rayon of Azerbaijan.
