= Kurdamir =

Kurdamir Kürdəmir
- City and municipality
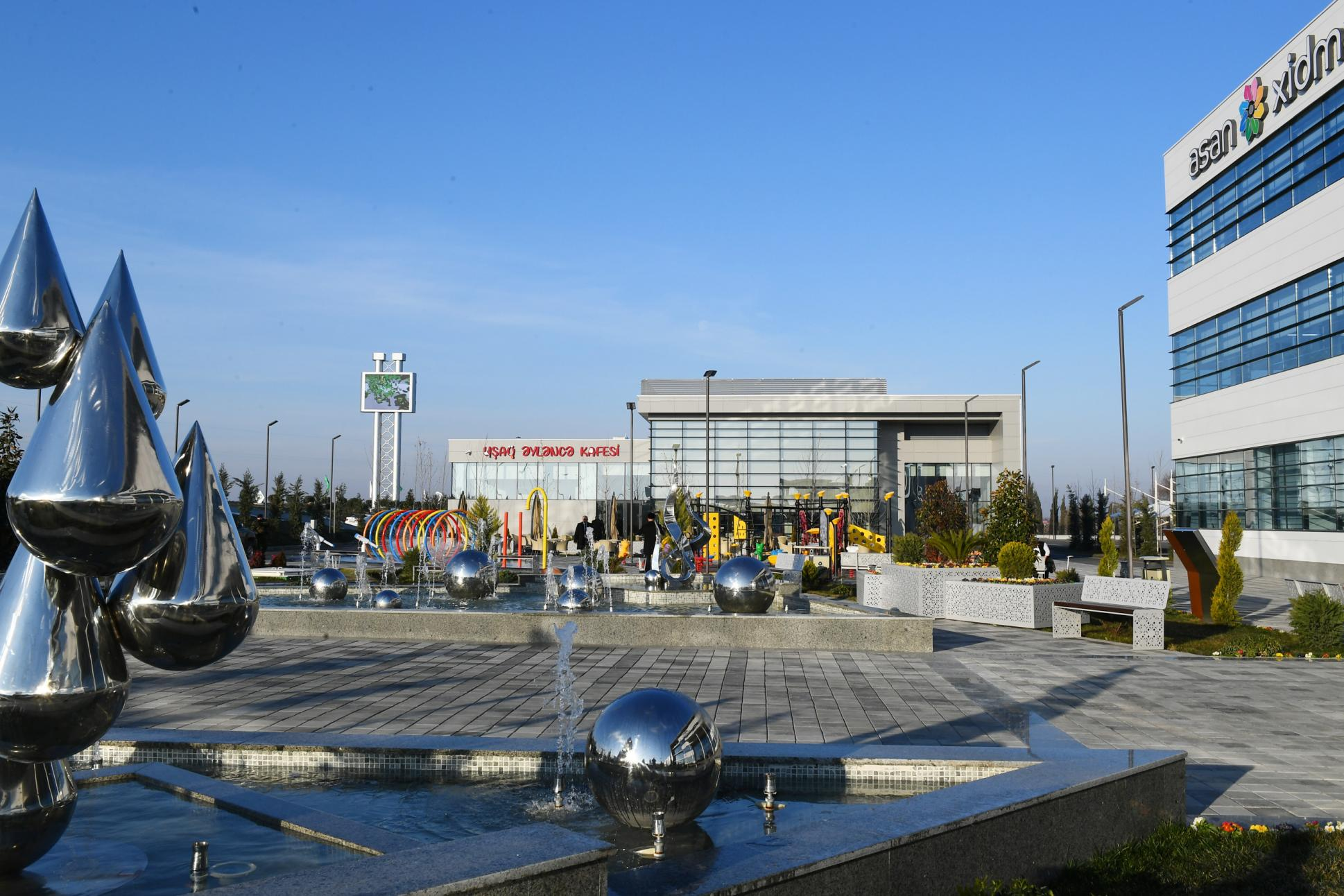
- Interactive map of Kurdamir
- Coordinates: 40°20′18″N 48°09′39″E
- Country: Azerbaijan
- District: Kurdamir
- Established: 1938
- Elevation: −9 m (−30 ft)

Population (2022–2023)
  - Total: 18,100
- Time zone: UTC+4 (AZT)
- Area code: +994 145

Kurdamir (Azerbaijani: Kürdəmir) is a city and the capital of the Kurdamir District of Azerbaijan. It is located in Aran Economic Region. The city's population is 18,100 people.

== Geography ==
The district shares borders with Agsu, Goychay, Ujar, Imishli, Sabirabad, Hajigabul and Zardab rayons. It has a warm semi-arid climate. The relief mainly consists of lowland plains that are below sea level. The river network is very sparse (Girdymanchay and Aghsu rivers flow through this region). Mainly Gray-Brown Earth and Gray soils are commonly found under Kserofit bushes and Tugay forests, semi-arid deserts. Wild boars, wolves, foxes, jackals, pheasants, francolins, wild ducks and geese, etc. constitute the fauna of the district. Moreover, the Shirvan collector passed through the territory of the district. The improper human activities when using irrigation, outstanding runoff precipitation, as well as the wind, cause soil erosion in the region.

== Climate ==
A dry subtropical climate is mostly characteristic of the region. These climates tend to have hot, sometimes extremely hot, summers and warm to cool winters, with some to minimal precipitation. Rainless summers and wetter winters. Rainfall ranges from 430 mm-185, relative air humidity from 50 - 60% in summer, 75 - 80% during the winter months. The average temperature is 4.6 °C in January and 28 °C in July. The average annual temperature is 15.8 °C in the region. The highest temperature ever recorded in Kurdamir was 44 °C (2000).

== History ==
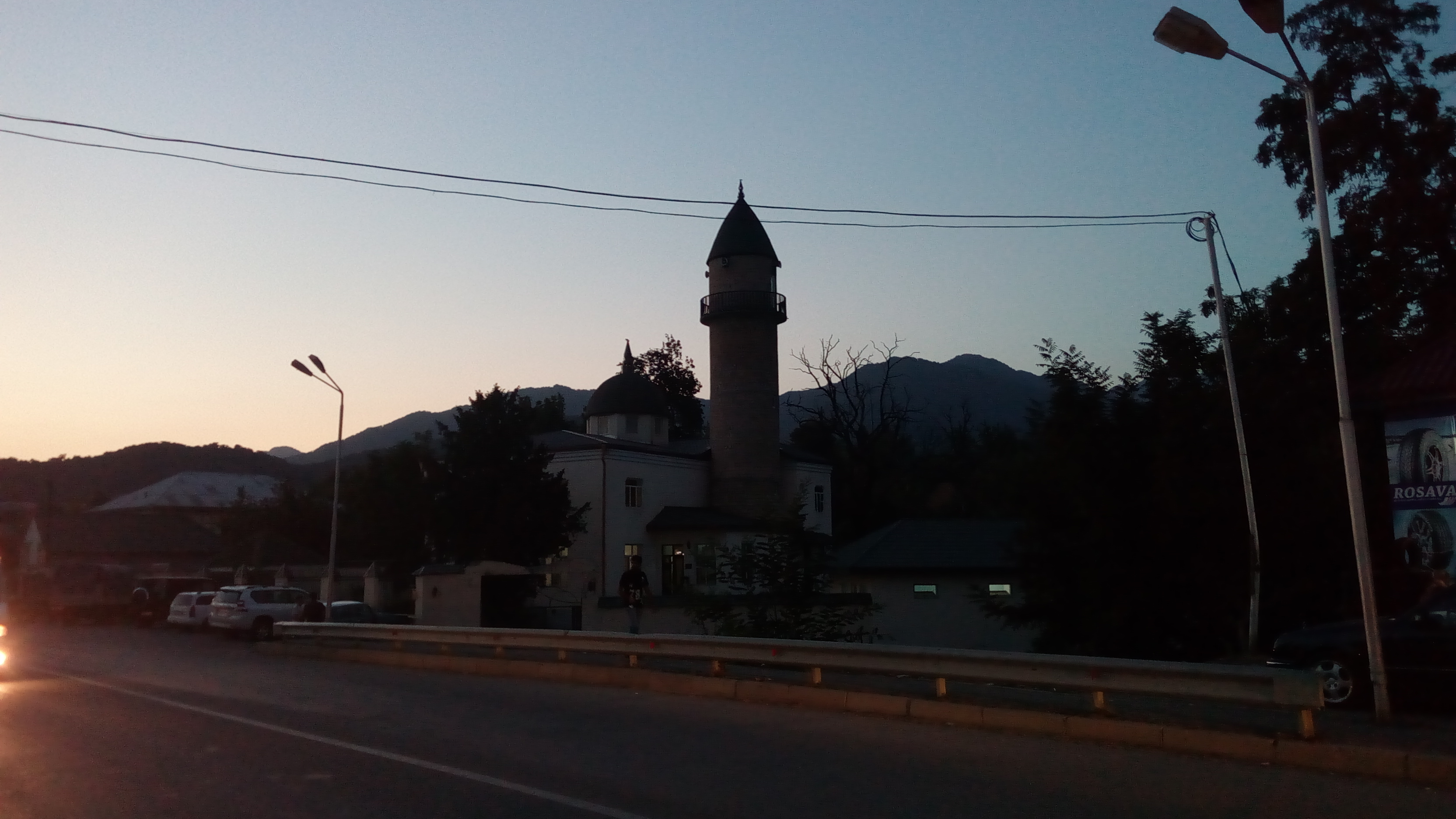
Mosque near to Kurdamir Highway

Kurdamir district was founded in 1930 as the center of the Aran economic region. In 1963, due to the creation of the party committees of the kolkhoz-sovkhoz production department, the Agsu and Kurdamir regions were united, and in January of the same year, the Kurdamir kolkhoz-sovkhoz party committee was established. In 1964, according to the plenum of the Central Committee of the Communist Party of the Azerbaijan SSR the new system was abolished, the old structure was restored, Kurdamir and Agsu districts were separated, and each started to function as an independent region. The share of industry in the economy of Kurdemir began to rise in 1883 after the establishment of the Baku-Tbilisi railway line. As the railway line passed through Kurdamir, it also contributed to the transportation of agricultural products on time and positively to the development of this field in the district. As a result of it, in 1884 Kurdemir's agricultural products were already sold in Russian markets. All the above factors led to the formation of Kurdamir as a new administrative center. At the beginning of the twentieth century, Kurdamir was already the administrative center of the Goychay region and included 67 villages and migratory places. During the Democratic Republic of Azerbaijan, Kurdamir became an active center in the liberation of Baku. In 1920, the Soviet power was established in Kurdamir as well as in the whole of Azerbaijan. Kurdemir played a major role as an economic and cultural center during the Soviet era.

== Economy ==
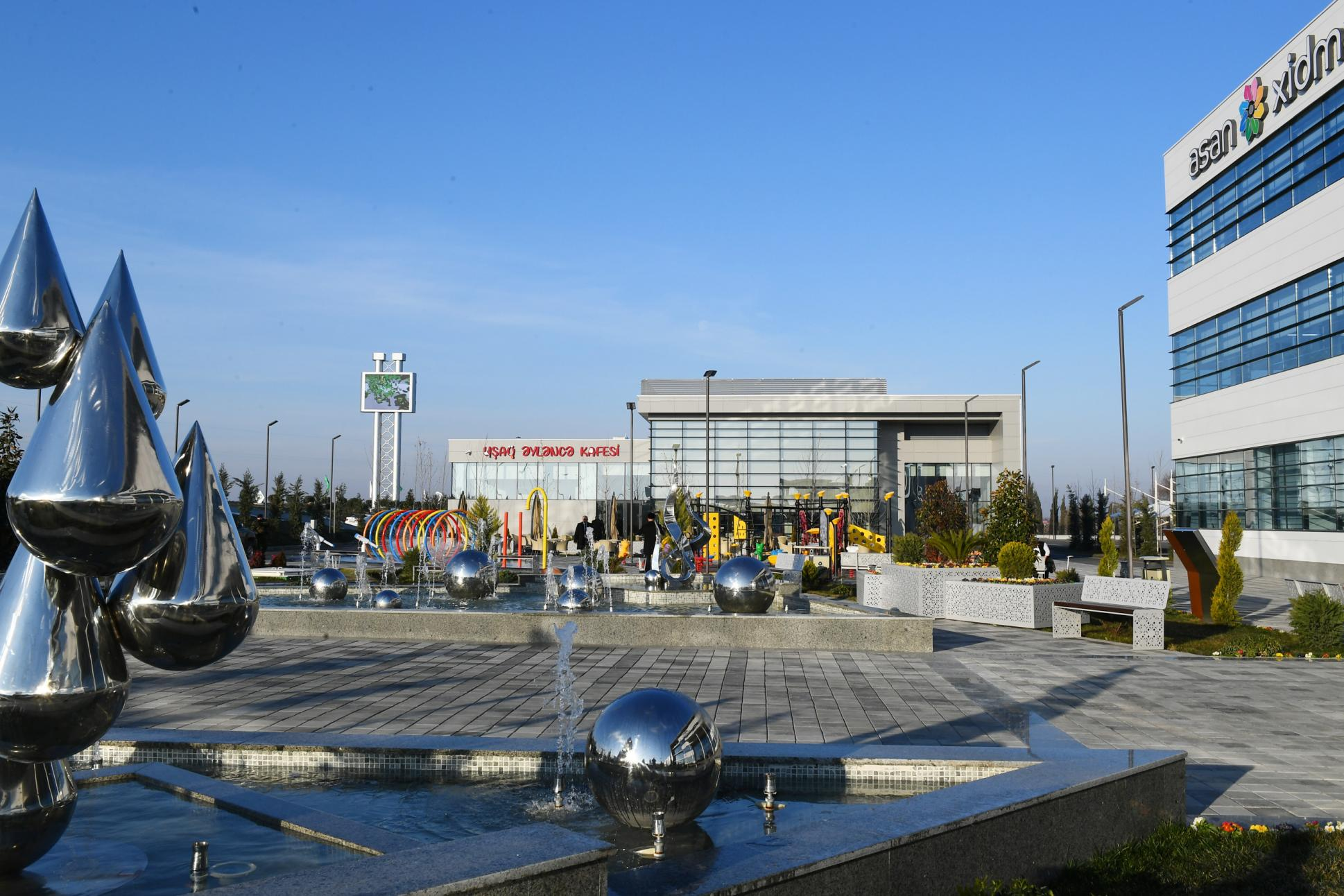
“ASAN service” center in Kurdamir

The economy of the district is mainly based on agriculture. Cotton growing, grain growing, livestock, as well as viticulture and fishery, are the important parts of its economy. The share of poultry and livestock in the district are considered essential.

=== Agriculture ===
The main agricultural outputs of the region are sugar beets, cotton growing, grain growing, viticulture, fishery, and dairy products related to livestock. In the Kurdamir region, 144 million 915.5 thousand AZN agricultural products were produced in 2017. The actual cost of gross output of agriculture increased by 18 million 941 thousand AZN or 13.1 percent, compared to the previous year. Thus, 40.6% of the total output of the region fell to the share of agriculture. Last year the region produced 14,795 tons of potatoes, 22,550 tons of vegetables, 69,833 tons of melons, 23 tons of groundwater, 875 tons of sugar beet, 20 tons of sunflower, 100 tons of soybeans, 103 tons of buckwheat, 26,176 tons of fruit, and 2,967 tons of grapes. More than 3,000 hectares of pomegranate gardens have been planted in the district, and more than 500 hectares of these gardens have been cultivated. Recently, the number of cattle has increased to 64,785, and the number of sheep and goats has increased to 135,861. In the first half of this year, meat production increased by 17.7%, dairy production by 6.7%, egg production by 64.5%, wool production by 21.5%. In the fall of last year, 45,040 hectares of grain, including 16,072 hectares of wheat, 28,968 hectares of barley, were sown.

	2010	2012	2013	2014	2015	2016
Total area of sown agricultural crops (ha)						
Cereals and cereal legumes	33954	37372	37210	36845	39608	40372
Including wheat	14138	14591	14804	14310	13424	13256
Cotton	19	191	51	21	22	1911
Sugar beet	-	-	100	-	-	-
Sunflower for seed production	130	69	336	54	86	11
Potato	1021	1333	1262	1184	1214	1217
Vegetables	2520	2983	2960	2780	2698	2475
Viticulture	3781	4267	4195	4027	4098	4059
Fruit and berry	2787	2904	2911	2683	2697	3071
Grape	521	364	371	371	248	248
Productivity (in all categories of farming), ton						
Cereals and cereal legumes	51371	75885	82476	61778	110697	104007
Including wheat	22774	29516	33401	23957	38290	36586
Cotton	21	81	26	12	10	2111
Sugar beet	-	-	90	-	-	-
Sunflower for seed production	114	84	384	75	121	19
Potato	10042	14035	13530	12858	13534	14089
Vegetables	18019	21094	21637	21818	22260	22514
Viticulture	42169	48073	48294	47916	65921	69602
Fruit and berry	20523	21381	21432	21574	22321	19384
Grape	4403	3986	3816	3994	2953	2753
Productivity (in all categories of farming), centner / ha						
Cereals and cereal legumes	15,1	20,3	22,2	16,8	27,9	25,8
Including wheat	16,1	20,2	22,6	16,7	28,5	27,6
Cotton	10,8	4,3	5,1	6,1	4,6	11,6
Sugar beet	-	-	9	-	-	-
Sunflower for seed production	9,1	12,7	11,9	14,6	14,9	17,9
Potato	98	105	107	109	112	112
Vegetables	72	71	73	78	83	85
Viticulture	112	113	115	119	161	172
Fruit and berry	104,4	87,5	86,2	89,9	91,1	79,0
Grape	66,1	74,5	68,2	66,8	47,4	51,1
Number of livestock (in total)						
Cattle	61353	63304	63597	62756	64098	64692
including cow and buffalo	31106	32507	33256	32889	33516	33548
Sheep and goats	129840	131428	133162	133269	131814	135562
Pigs	187	250	261	260	252	221
Birds	344272	359122	372878	372023	375903	382291
Bee Families	782	828	845	889	998	1036
Production of animal products, ton						
Meat	5098	5313	5438	5490	5528	5537
Milk	32693	37400	41564	41620	41786	42786
Eggs, thousand	14242	14755	14853	15497	15544	15553
Wool	211	211	214	216	221	222

=== Industry ===
Kurdamir branch of “Azerkhalcha” OJSC (AzerCarpet)

	2010	2012	2013	2014	2015	2016
Number of operating enterprises total, unit	14	15	11	11	11	11
Industrial product (actual price of the relevant year), thousand AZN	37300	38419	45489	24905	55111	69963
Industrial product, relative to previous year, in percent (at comparable prices)	174,5	151,8	99,5	63,3	190,0	108,5
Share of private sector in industrial product, in percent	93,3	92,4	92,5	82,8	90,8	92,2
Price of finished goods remaining in inventory at the end of the period, thousand AZN	35,5	33,9	14,6	80,5	127,5	112,8
Average number of employees - total	485	592	677	687	527	661
Average monthly salary of employees, AZN	207,4	263,7	306,6	330,2	375,9	394,8
Availability of the main industrial and production assets (at the end of the year, at balance sheet), thousand AZN	33751	41503	46414	46411	47602	51265
Production of basic types of products in natural expression:						
Flour	135432	117523	104327	58097	122181	105717
Alcohol, thousand dekaliter	13,8	30,0	23,4	15,8	2,4	0,3
Brandy (cognac), dekaliter	10,0	19,3	11,7	1,8	-	7,7
Fermented milk, ton	-	273,3	2026	941,7	1545	1920
Sour cream and heavy cream, ton	-	-	-	-	30,3	345,4
Bread and bakery products, tons	177,0	265,0	206,0	193,0	141	38,8

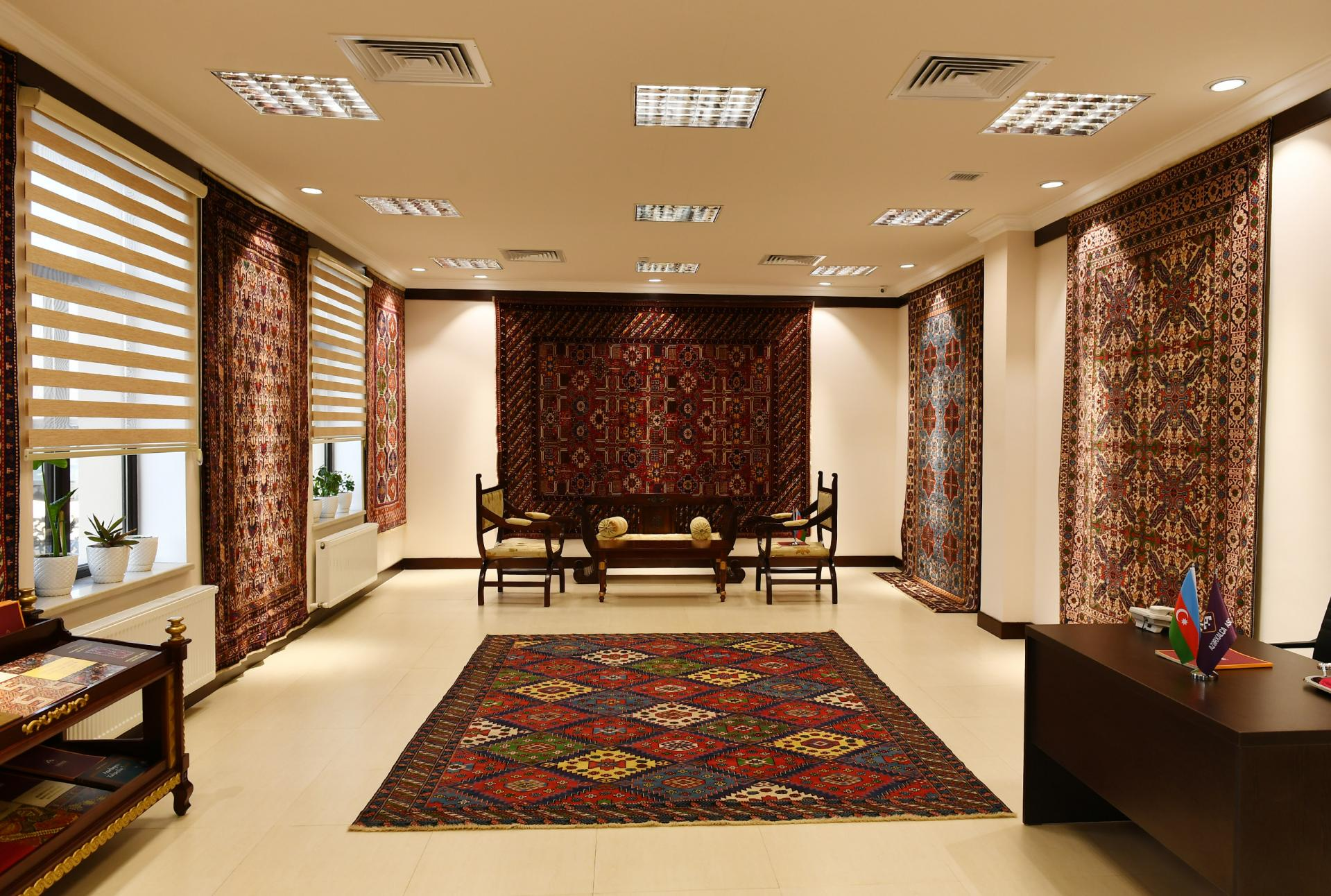
Carpets Made by Azerkhalcha

.

== Transport ==
=== Rail ===
Kars–Tbilisi–Baku railway will directly connect the city with Turkey and Georgia.

Kürdəmir sits on one of the Azerbaijani primary rail lines running east–west, connecting the capital, Baku, with the rest of the country. The Kars–Tbilisi–Baku railway will run along the line through the city. The railway provides both human transportation and transport of goods and commodities such as oil and gravel.

Kürdəmir's Central Railway Station is the terminus for national and international rail links to the city. The Kars–Tbilisi–Baku railway, which will directly connect Turkey, Georgia, and Azerbaijan, began to be constructed in 2007 and is scheduled for completion in 2015. The completed branch will connect the city with Tbilisi in Georgia, and from there trains will continue to Akhalkalaki, and Kars in Turkey.
