= Hinqar =

Hinqar Հնղար • Hnghar
- Location within Azerbaijan
- Coordinates: 40°38′09″N 48°19′41″E
- Country: Azerbaijan
- District: Agsu
- Municipality: Xanbulaq
- Time zone: UTC+4 (AZT)

Hinqar (Armenian: Հնղար, romanized: Hnghar or Henghar, also Armenian: Ինգար, romanized: Ingar and Incha) is a village in the Agsu District of Azerbaijan. The village forms part of the municipality of Xanbulaq. The village had an Armenian population before the exodus of Armenians from Azerbaijan after the outbreak of the Nagorno-Karabakh conflict.
