= Yenilik =

Coordinates: 40°35′N 48°20′E

Yenilik is a village and municipality in the Agsu Rayon of Azerbaijan. It has a population of 1,174. The municipality consists of the villages of Yenilik, Gursulu, and Elabad.

The original name is Seferbine. Native language of the village is kurush dialect of lezgian.
