= Yeni Şıxımlı =

Coordinates: 40°18′N 48°12′E

Yeni Şıxımlı is a village and municipality in the Kurdamir Rayon of Azerbaijan.
