= Dayıkazımlı =

- Municipality
- Location within Azerbaijan
- Coordinates: 40°05′05″N 48°18′57″E
- Country: Azerbaijan
- Rayon: Kurdamir
- Time zone: UTC+4 (AZT)
  - Summer (DST): UTC+5 (AZT)

Dayıkazımlı is a village and municipality in the Kurdamir Rayon of Azerbaijan.
