= Qəşəd =

- Municipality
- Location within Azerbaijan
- Coordinates: 40°29′29″N 48°33′57″E
- Country: Azerbaijan
- Rayon: Agsu

Population
  - Total: 1,096
- Time zone: UTC+4 (AZT)
  - Summer (DST): UTC+5 (AZT)

Qəşəd (also, Kashad and Keshad) is a village and municipality in the Agsu Rayon of Azerbaijan. It has a population of 1,096.
