= Çöl Qubalı =

Village in Kurdamir Rayon, Azerbaijan

Coordinates: 40°10′N 48°23′E

Çöl Qubalı is a village and municipality in the Kurdamir Rayon of Azerbaijan.
