= Söyüdlər =

- Municipality
- Location within Azerbaijan
- Coordinates: 40°06′15″N 47°55′52″E
- Country: Azerbaijan
- Rayon: Kurdamir
- Time zone: UTC+4 (AZT)
  - Summer (DST): UTC+5 (AZT)

Söyüdlər (also, Sëyudlyar and Soyutlar) is a village and municipality in the Kurdamir Rayon of Azerbaijan.
