= Qırlar =

- Location within Azerbaijan
- Coordinates: 40°40′N 48°28′E
- Country: Azerbaijan
- Rayon: Agsu
- Municipality: Nüydü
- Time zone: UTC+4 (AZT)
  - Summer (DST): UTC+5 (AZT)

Qırlar (also, Gyrlar and Kyrlar) is a village in the Agsu Rayon of Azerbaijan. The village forms part of the municipality of Nüydü.
