= Garış-Əyribənd =

Coordinates: 40°21′N 48°23′E

Garış-Əyribənd is a village and municipality in the Kurdamir Rayon of Azerbaijan.
