= Ərəbuşağı =

- Municipality
- Location within Azerbaijan
- Coordinates: 40°31′50″N 48°25′09″E
- Country: Azerbaijan
- Rayon: Agsu

Population
  - Total: 1,745
- Time zone: UTC+4 (AZT)
  - Summer (DST): UTC+5 (AZT)

Ərəbuşağı (also, Arabushagy) is a village and municipality in the Agsu Rayon of Azerbaijan. It has a population of 1,745.
