= Tatarkend =

- Location within Azerbaijan
- Coordinates: 40°14′49″N 48°15′37″E
- Country: Azerbaijan
- Rayon: Kurdamir
- Time zone: UTC+4 (AZT)
  - Summer (DST): UTC+5 (AZT)

Tatarkend is a village in the Kurdamir Rayon of Azerbaijan.
