= Gəgəli =

- Municipality
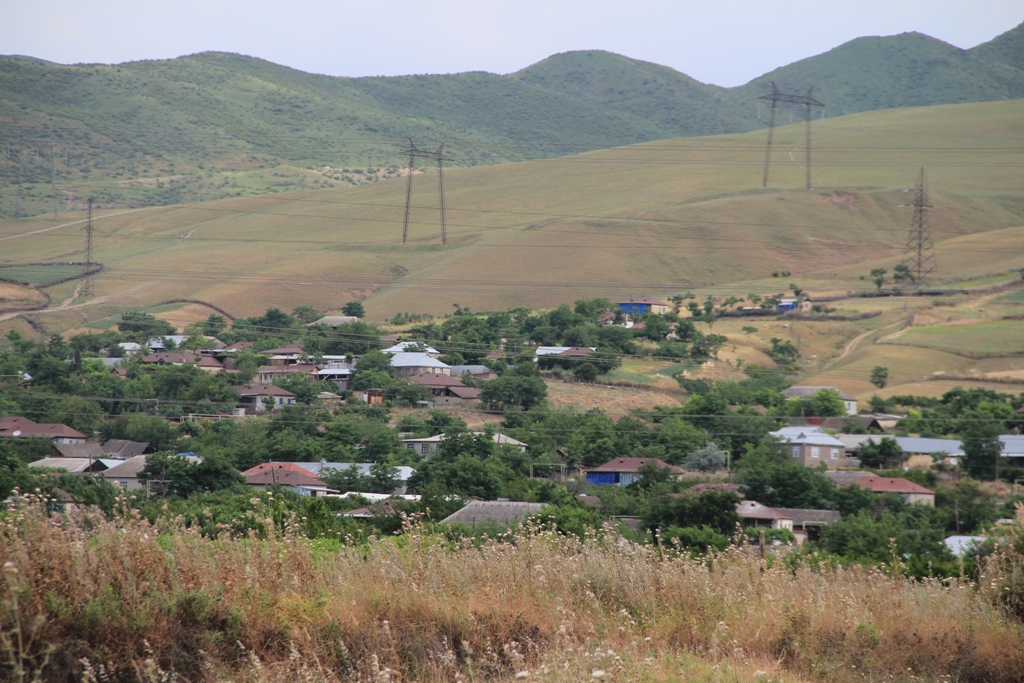
- View of the villafe

- Location within Azerbaijan
- Coordinates: 40°32′32″N 48°29′46″E
- Country: Azerbaijan
- Rayon: Agsu

Population
  - Total: 3,502
- Time zone: UTC+4 (AZT)
  - Summer (DST): UTC+5 (AZT)

Gəgəli (also, Gegele, Gegeli, and Gyagyali) is a village and the most populous municipality, except for Agsu, in the Agsu Rayon of Azerbaijan. It has a population of 3,502.
