= Ülgüc =

Village in Agsu Rayon, Azerbaijan

Coordinates: 40°33′N 48°23′E

Ülgüc is a village and municipality in the Agsu Rayon of Azerbaijan. It has a population of 515.
