= Melikumud =

- Location within Azerbaijan
- Coordinates: 40°26′41″N 48°05′54″E
- Country: Azerbaijan
- Rayon: Kurdamir
- Time zone: UTC+4 (AZT)
  - Summer (DST): UTC+5 (AZT)

Melikumud (also, Melikumu) is a village in the Kurdamir Rayon of Azerbaijan.
