= Göydəlləkli =

- Municipality
- Location within Azerbaijan
- Coordinates: 40°28′12″N 48°13′34″E
- Country: Azerbaijan
- Rayon: Agsu

Population
  - Total: 557
- Time zone: UTC+4 (AZT)
  - Summer (DST): UTC+5 (AZT)

Göydəlləkli (also, Gey-Dellekli and Gëydellyakli) is a village and municipality in the Agsu Rayon of Azerbaijan. It has a population of 557. It has a semi-arid climate prevailing, with limited rainfall. The highest average temperature is observed in July at 36°C and the coldest is 8°C in January.
