= Yenikənd, Agsu =

Yenikənd
- Location within Azerbaijan
- Coordinates: 40°39′N 48°23′E
- Country: Azerbaijan
- Rayon: Agsu
- Municipality: Gürcüvan
- Time zone: UTC+4 (AZT)
  - Summer (DST): UTC+5 (AZT)

Yenikənd (also Yenikend), is a village in Agsu Rayon, Azerbaijan. The village forms part of the municipality of Gürcüvan.
