= Kubalikend =

Kubalikend may refer to:

- Ərəb Qubalı, Azerbaijan
- Xasıdərə, Azerbaijan
