= Karaganly =

- Location within Azerbaijan
- Coordinates: 40°21′54″N 48°26′47″E
- Country: Azerbaijan
- Rayon: Agsu
- Time zone: UTC+4 (AZT)
  - Summer (DST): UTC+5 (AZT)

Karaganly (also, Karagarly) is a village in the Agsu Rayon of Azerbaijan.
