= Daşdəmirbəyli =

- Municipality
- Location within Azerbaijan
- Coordinates: 40°31′54″N 48°26′07″E
- Country: Azerbaijan
- Rayon: Agsu

Population
  - Total: 915
- Time zone: UTC+4 (AZT)
  - Summer (DST): UTC+5 (AZT)

Daşdəmirbəyli (also known as Daşdəmir, Dashdamirbegli, and Dashdemirbeyli) is a village and municipality in the Agsu Rayon of Azerbaijan. It has a population of 915.
