= Sığırlı =

- Municipality
- Location within Azerbaijan
- Coordinates: 40°15′59″N 48°24′33″E
- Country: Azerbaijan
- Rayon: Kurdamir
- Time zone: UTC+4 (AZT)
  - Summer (DST): UTC+5 (AZT)

Sığırlı (also, Sagiri, Sagiry, Sagyrly, and Sygyrly) is a village and municipality in the Kurdamir Rayon of Azerbaijan. Village has a population around 8,000 in 2023.
