= Xırdapay =

- Municipality
- Location within Azerbaijan
- Coordinates: 40°21′48″N 48°08′34″E
- Country: Azerbaijan
- Rayon: Kurdamir
- Time zone: UTC+4 (AZT)
  - Summer (DST): UTC+5 (AZT)

Xırdapay (also, Khyrdapay and Khyrdaray) is a village and municipality in the Kurdamir Rayon of Azerbaijan.
