= Kəndoba =

- Municipality
- Location within Azerbaijan
- Coordinates: 40°24′19″N 48°26′49″E
- Country: Azerbaijan
- Rayon: Agsu

Population
  - Total: 2,104
- Time zone: UTC+4 (AZT)
  - Summer (DST): UTC+5 (AZT)

Kəndoba (also known as Kendoba and Kyandoba) is a village and municipality in the Agsu Rayon of Azerbaijan. It has a population of 2,104.
