= Çöhranlı =

- Municipality
- Location within Azerbaijan
- Coordinates: 40°17′08″N 48°11′32″E
- Country: Azerbaijan
- Rayon: Kurdamir
- Elevation: −4 m (−13 ft)
- Time zone: UTC+4 (AZT)
  - Summer (DST): UTC+5 (AZT)

Çöhranlı (also, Cheyrany and Chovranly) is a village and municipality in the Kurdamir Rayon of Azerbaijan. Located in short distance from the Village are the Hərbi Hava Bazası Kürdəmir Airbase and the Kürdəmirli Hərbi Şəhərcik MIlitary Base.
