= Ərəbxana =

- Municipality
- Location within Azerbaijan
- Coordinates: 40°09′48″N 48°03′46″E
- Country: Azerbaijan
- Rayon: Kurdamir
- Time zone: UTC+4 (AZT)
  - Summer (DST): UTC+5 (AZT)

Ərəbxana (also, Arabkhana) is a village and municipality in the Kurdamir Rayon of Azerbaijan.

== Notable natives ==
- Zabit Guliyev — National Hero of Azerbaijan.
