= Ərəbsarvan =

- Municipality
- Location within Azerbaijan
- Coordinates: 40°32′27″N 48°13′23″E
- Country: Azerbaijan
- Rayon: Agsu

Population
  - Total: 512
- Time zone: UTC+4 (AZT)
  - Summer (DST): UTC+5 (AZT)

Ərəbsarvan is a village and municipality in the Agsu Rayon of Azerbaijan. It has a population of 512.
