= Kövlüc =

- Location within Azerbaijan
- Coordinates: 40°37′22″N 48°23′17″E
- Country: Azerbaijan
- Rayon: Agsu
- Municipality: Gürcüvan
- Time zone: UTC+4 (AZT)
  - Summer (DST): UTC+5 (AZT)

Kövlüc (also, Kevlyudzh) is a village in the Agsu Rayon of Azerbaijan. The village forms part of the municipality of Gürcüvan.
