= Növcü =

- Municipality
- Location within Azerbaijan
- Coordinates: 40°31′55″N 48°15′47″E
- Country: Azerbaijan
- Rayon: Agsu

Population
  - Total: 1,151
- Time zone: UTC+4 (AZT)
  - Summer (DST): UTC+5 (AZT)

Növcü (also, Novdzhu) is a village and municipality in the Agsu Rayon of Azerbaijan. It has a population of 1,151.

The village's history dates back to the establishment of a canal in the 19th century from the river Kura. The meaning of the name comes from "New Ditch" (nov meaning new, çu meaning ditch).
