= Kalağaylı =

- Municipality
- Location within Azerbaijan
- Coordinates: 40°36′07″N 48°17′21″E
- Country: Azerbaijan
- Rayon: Agsu

Population
  - Total: 275
- Time zone: UTC+4 (AZT)
  - Summer (DST): UTC+5 (AZT)

Kalağaylı (also known as Kalagayly, Kalagayni, and Kalageyli) is a village and municipality in the Agsu Rayon of Azerbaijan. It has a population of 275.
