= Elabad =

Village in the Azerbaijani municipality of Yenilik

- Location within Azerbaijan
- Country: Azerbaijan
- District: Agsu
- Municipality: Yenilik
- Time zone: UTC+4 (AZT)

Elabad is a village in the municipality of Yenilik in the Agsu Rayon of Azerbaijan.
