= Mürtülü =

Coordinates: 40°23′N 48°10′E

Mürtülü is a village and municipality in the Kurdamir Rayon of Azerbaijan.
