= Zərdab (disambiguation) =

Zərdab may refer to:

- Zardab Rayon, Azerbaijan
- Zardab (city), Azerbaijan
- Zərdab, Agsu, Azerbaijan
