= Məhərrəmli =

- Municipality
- Location within Azerbaijan
- Coordinates: 40°10′29″N 48°21′15″E
- Country: Azerbaijan
- Rayon: Kurdamir
- Time zone: UTC+4 (AZT)
  - Summer (DST): UTC+5 (AZT)

Məhərrəmli (also, Magerramli) is a village and municipality in the Kurdamir Rayon of Azerbaijan. The closest major cities include Baku, Ardabīl, Tabrīz and Makhachkala.

== Bibliography ==
- Məhərrəmli at GEOnet Names Server
