= Gursulu =

Gursulu is a village in the municipality of Yenilik in the Agsu Rayon of Azerbaijan.

== Geography ==
The village is located in the Agsu District in central Azerbaijan, within the South Caucasus region. It lies near several small villages, such as Padar and Kalağaylı. The village has an elevation of approximately 262 meters above sea level.

Approximate coordinates of the village:

- Latitude: 40.607° N
- Longitude: 48.279° E
