= Rəhimli, Agsu =

Rəhimli
- Municipality
- Location within Azerbaijan
- Coordinates: 40°27′16″N 48°23′08″E
- Country: Azerbaijan
- Rayon: Agsu

Population
  - Total: 741
- Time zone: UTC+4 (AZT)
  - Summer (DST): UTC+5 (AZT)

Rəhimli (also, Ragimli) is a village and municipality in the Agsu Rayon of Azerbaijan. It has a population of 741.

== Notable natives ==
- Shamil Ramazanov — National Hero of Azerbaijan.
