= Girdə =

- Location within Azerbaijan
- Coordinates: 40°38′N 48°18′E
- Country: Azerbaijan
- Rayon: Agsu
- Municipality: Gürcüvan
- Time zone: UTC+4 (AZT)
  - Summer (DST): UTC+5 (AZT)

Girdə (also, Girde) is a village in the Agsu Rayon of Azerbaijan. The village forms part of the municipality of Gürcüvan.
