= Keşdiməz =

- Municipality
- Location within Azerbaijan
- Coordinates: 40°32′N 48°36′E
- Country: Azerbaijan
- Rayon: Agsu

Population
  - Total: 282
- Time zone: UTC+4 (AZT)
  - Summer (DST): UTC+5 (AZT)

Keşdiməz (also, Keshdimyaz and Keshtimez) is a village and municipality in the Agsu Rayon of Azerbaijan. It has a population of 282.
