= Tazanovdzhi =

- Location within Azerbaijan
- Coordinates: 40°29′31″N 48°15′15″E
- Country: Azerbaijan
- Rayon: Agsu
- Time zone: UTC+4 (AZT)
  - Summer (DST): UTC+5 (AZT)

Tazanovdzhi is a village in the Agsu Rayon of Azerbaijan.
