= Ağalarbəyli =

- Municipality
- Location within Azerbaijan
- Coordinates: 40°31′09″N 48°24′54″E
- Country: Azerbaijan
- Rayon: Agsu

Population
  - Total: 882
- Time zone: UTC+4 (AZT)
  - Summer (DST): UTC+5 (AZT)

Ağalarbəyli is a village and municipality in the Agsu Rayon of Azerbaijan. It has a population of 882.
