= Qağacılı =

Coordinates: 40°22′N 48°09′E

Qağacılı is a village and municipality in the Kurdamir Rayon of Azerbaijan.
