= Bala-Muradkhan =

- Location within Azerbaijan
- Coordinates: 40°14′N 48°09′E
- Country: Azerbaijan
- Rayon: Kurdamir
- Time zone: UTC+4 (AZT)
  - Summer (DST): UTC+5 (AZT)

Bala-Muradkhan is a village in the Kurdamir Rayon of Azerbaijan (AJ).
