= Abasxanlı =

- Municipality
- Location within Azerbaijan
- Coordinates: 40°22′N 48°24′E
- Country: Azerbaijan
- Rayon: Agsu

Population
  - Total: 636
- Time zone: UTC+4 (AZT)
  - Summer (DST): UTC+5 (AZT)

Abasxanlı (also, Abaskhanly) is a village and municipality in the Agsu Rayon of Azerbaijan. It has a population of 636.
