= Rəhimağalı =

- Municipality
- Location within Azerbaijan
- Coordinates: 40°30′51″N 48°24′41″E
- Country: Azerbaijan
- Rayon: Agsu

Population
  - Total: 123
- Time zone: UTC+4 (AZT)
  - Summer (DST): UTC+5 (AZT)

Rəhimağalı (also, Ragimagaly) is a village and municipality in the Agsu Rayon of Azerbaijan. It has a population of 123.
