= Həmzəli, Kurdamir =

Həmzəli
- Location within Azerbaijan
- Coordinates: 40°09′58″N 48°21′34″E
- Country: Azerbaijan
- Rayon: Kurdamir
- Time zone: UTC+4 (AZT)
  - Summer (DST): UTC+5 (AZT)

Həmzəli (also, Gamzaly) is a village in the Kurdamir Rayon of Azerbaijan.
