= Maşadqanlı =

Maşadqanlı Maşadqanlı
- Location within Azerbaijan
- Coordinates: 40°30′N 48°24′E
- Country: Azerbaijan
- Rayon: Agsu

Population
  - Total: 523
- Time zone: UTC+4 (AZT)
  - Summer (DST): UTC+5 (AZT)

Maşadqanlı (known as Birinci Aratkənd until 1992) is a village and municipality in the Agsu Rayon of Azerbaijan. It has a population of 523.
