= Şahbəyli, Kurdamir =

Şahbəyli
- Municipality
- Location within Azerbaijan
- Coordinates: 40°26′N 48°17′E
- Country: Azerbaijan
- Rayon: Kurdamir
- Time zone: UTC+4 (AZT)
  - Summer (DST): UTC+5 (AZT)

Şahbəyli (also, Şahbeyli and Shakhbeyli) is a village and municipality in the Kurdamir Rayon of Azerbaijan.
