= Nüydü =

- Municipality
- Location within Azerbaijan
- Coordinates: 40°41′39″N 48°24′01″E
- Country: Azerbaijan
- Rayon: Agsu

Population
  - Total: 577
- Time zone: UTC+4 (AZT)
  - Summer (DST): UTC+5 (AZT)

Nüydü (also, Nüydi, Nyugdi, and Nyuydi) is a village and municipality in the Agsu Rayon of Azerbaijan. It has a population of 577. The municipality consists of the villages of Nüydü, Xasıdərə, Qırlar, Quzey, and Sanqalan.
