= Xanbulaq, Agsu =

Xanbulaq
- Municipality
- Location within Azerbaijan
- Coordinates: 40°38′35″N 48°21′10″E
- Country: Azerbaijan
- Rayon: Agsu

Population
  - Total: 300
- Time zone: UTC+4 (AZT)

Xanbulaq, Gürcüvan (?-2018) (also, Gyurdzhivan, Gyurdzhyuvan, and Gyurzhyuvan) is a village and municipality in the Agsu Rayon of Azerbaijan. It has a population of 300. The municipality consists of the villages of Gürcüvan, Kəndaxan, Yenikənd, Hinqar, Girdə, and Kövlüc.
