= Arts of Caucasian Albania =

Historical and regional type of arts related to Caucasian Albania

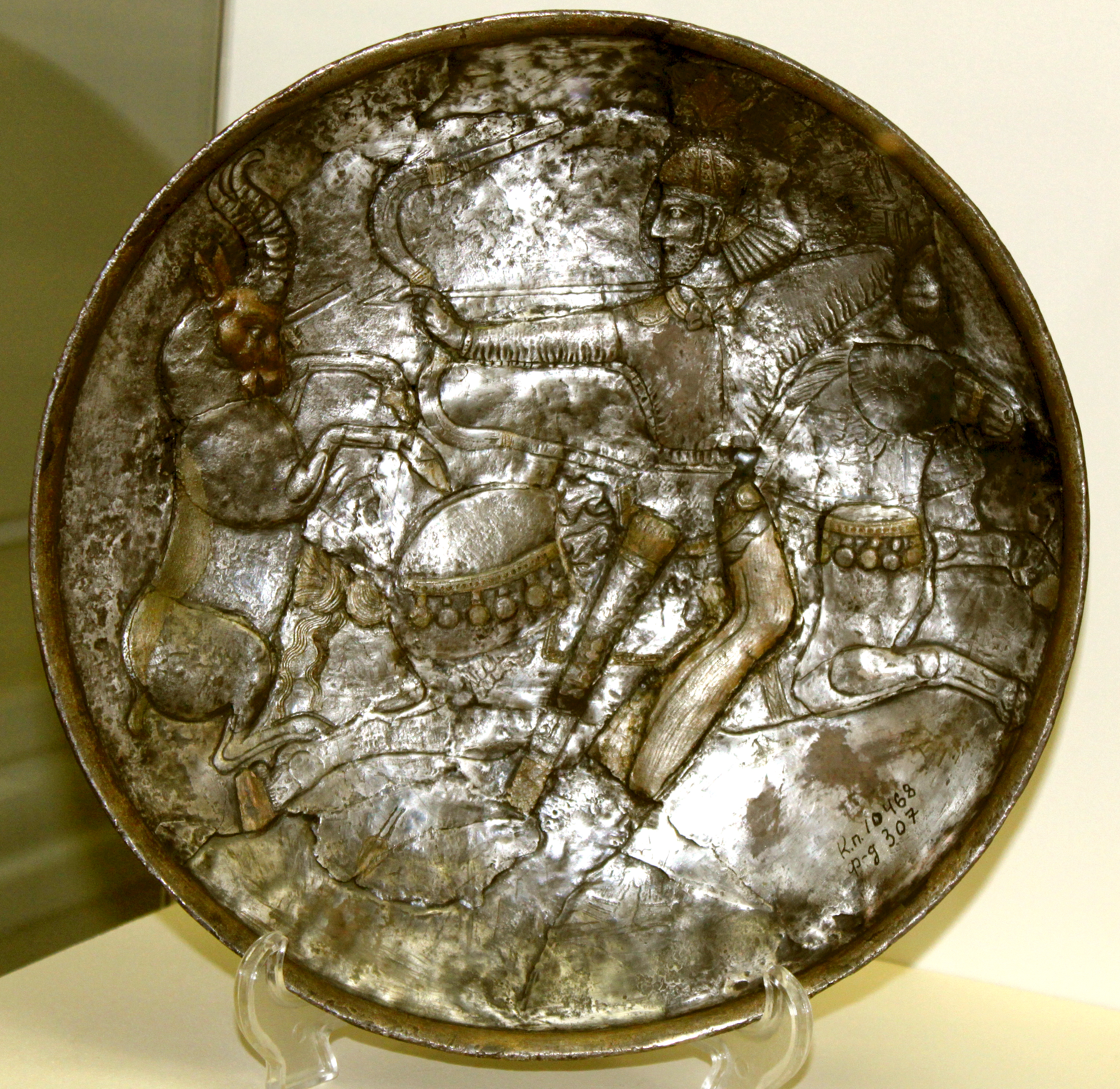
Sassanian copper dish from Khinisly village (not far from Shamakhi), from the ancient monument of Caucasian Albania, Azerbaijan State Museum of History

Arts of Caucasian Albania – is the historical and regional type of arts related to Ancient East.

Investigation of archeological material favours the restoration picture of development of arts in Caucasian Albania. Arts of the Middle Ages was protensity of previous periods of creative development of masters of Caucasian Albania. If artistic nature and character of arts of Caucasian Albania of earlier periods was determined by religious ideas, but from the beginning of the first centuries of new era it became weaker and yielded to progressive ideas related to origination and development of feudalism. Arts of the second period which was generally directed to high-society advanced humanistic ideas, which were substituted cultic tendencies of previous epochs.

== Investigation history of Caucasian Albania ==
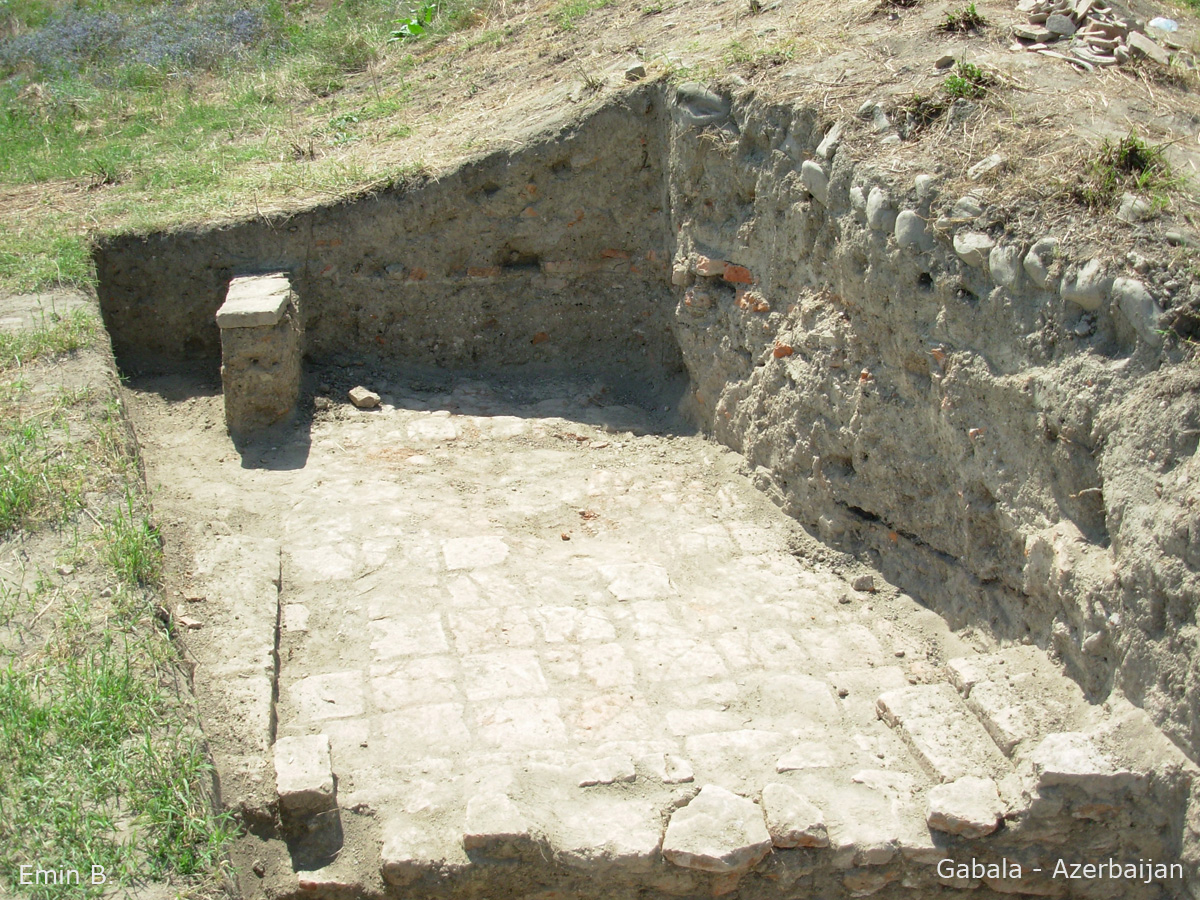
Place of archaeological excavations in Gabala - ancient capital of Albania. Qabala Rayon, Azerbaijan.

In 1926, an archaeological inspection of Yaloylutepe area of Nukhinsky Uyezd was held by D.M.Sharifov, where they opened interments with peculiar shapes and decorations with ceramics. These excavations were the beginning of subsequent appearance of interments of Yaloylutepe type in different regions of Azerbaijan and the eastern Georgia. Investigation of Gabala fortress was held by D.Sharifov jointly with I.M.Jafarzade, K.A.Klementyev and R.Efendiyev in that very year, in the result of which description of archaeological condition of the first capital of Albanian state was published by D.Sharifov.

The main part of excavations and investigation of jar burials in Mingachevir and in other districts were held by T.I.Golubkina, who investigated the issue of zoomorphism ceramics in Mingachevir, marks on ceramics and various excavations. Y.A.Pakhomov, N.V.Minkevich-Mustafayeva, R.M.Vaidov, V.P.Fomenko, G.M.Aslanov and K.M.Akhmedov took part in excavation of Mingachevir and investigation of its monuments in different times. Monuments of material culture of Albania found such a multilateral investigator as Y.A.Pakhomov, whose valuable works about numismatics of the Caucasus were famous: six editions were dedicated to monetary treasures, which were founded in the territory of Azerbaijan. Jar burials in Mingachevir and in other districts, defensive walls of Sasanids period in the territory of Albania, Roman ligature on Boyuk Dash (Gobustan), Albanian carved stones were also noted by Y.A.Pakhomov. Various articles dedicated to interesting burners made of ceramics, which were found out in Mingachevir, and also issues about dating of jar and ground burials and peculiar jars in shape of boots, which were found in earlier burials of Mingachevir, were written by G.I.Ione. Various works of Z.I.Yampolski were dedicated to certain monuments – the first Latin inscription, which was found in Azerbaijan, in 1848 and stone monument, which was found in Shamakhi rayon and others.

O.S.Ismizade’s work – “Yaloylutepe culture”, which was called the first successful work in generalization of historical and archeological material about Yaloylutepe culture and published in 1956, is considered the first effort in archeological investigation and generalization of material culture of Caucasian Albania. A number of investigations dedicated to archeological culture of Caucasian Albania are appeared after it. Great monographic investigation of Mingechevir archeologists – G.M.Aslanov, R.M.Vaidov and G.I.Ione, in which great amount of excavations of Copper and Bronze Ages were examined should also be mentioned. Work of Kamilla Trever, who made a great contribution to investigation of culture of Caucasian Albania, appeared at that time.

Investigations of R.M.Vahidov and Z.I.Yampolski, dedicated to material and religious culture of Caucasian Albania, are also very interesting. The range of questions related to material and religious life of Mingachevir in abroad, in the 3rd to 8th centuries were covered, kinds of housekeeping, construction, handicraft, burials, epigraphic monuments of ancient Mingachevir were persuasively analyzed in R.M.Vahidov’s work. Facts about production of glass, ceramics and other types of handicraft were especially evaluated. Number of dissertations of historians and archaeologists of the Azerbaijan SSR, dedicated to different stages of development of the culture of Caucasian Albania were defended in 1960’s. Particularly, works of G.M.Aslanov, I.A.Babayev, and A.B.Nuriyev, dedicated to jewelry, glyptics and glass can be called. But these works didn’t examine artistic features of archaeological materials, they didn’t trace development of artistic forms and influence of concrete religious ideas of ancient epochs on them and they hadn’t analyzed issues of periodization of development of arts of Caucasian Albania and other issues. N.I.Rzayev began elaboration of this issue and as a result, a monograph dedicated to ceramics of Caucasian Albania was published.

== Categories of Albanian arts ==
=== Items made of silver ===
Silver dishes were found out in Sudagylan (near Mingachevir) city, in 1949-1950’s. Ornamentation of a silver cup on an annular leg from Mingachevir of 1st to 4th centuries is characterized by decorative motifs like hollows. Rhythmic repetition of "spoons" can be met in analogical silver cup of the 3rd century from Torpaggala. Image of a deer, which is torn to pieces by a winged lion, is engraved in depth of the cup. An ancient Georgian silver cup of the 2nd century from Armaziskhevi and a silver cup of the 2nd century found in a jar-burial in Garamaryam village of Goychay rayon are analogical with Mingachevir cup. These cups are of the same type for their constructive features.

Antique silver dish of the 2nd century AD with a relief image of Nereid swimming in sea on a hippocamp surrounded by tritons and eroses (The Hermitage Museum), which was found in the end of 1843, far from Yenikend village of Lachin area of Baku Governorate’s Goychay rayon is considered the unique monument of arts. The finding was found out by chance when digging ground of a mountainous area.

Masters of toreutics of Caucasian Albania of the 1st-8th centuries used the shape of bottom in artistic ornamentation of silver cups, the central motif of which is notable for incisions around it. A cut figure like that makes the shape of bottom salient.

=== Items made of bronze ===
There are many bronze items related to the epoch of Caucasian Albania. For example, bracelets made of bronze adorn zoomorph jars of the North Caucasus. Ceramic jars of cultic character, the necks of which are surrounded by one or two bronze rings, were found in pitcher burials of Mingachevir. Jars from the 1st century BC to the 1st century AD, had necks which were adorned with bronze and iron rings with apotropous meaning were found in Mingachevir. It is considered that, bronze bracelets had been widely used as a cultic item in everyday life and burials of the examined period and were directed against “evil spirit”. Two bronze plates and bronze pitcher from collection of the Hermitage Museum, which were brought from the southern auls of Dagestan, are interesting materials about development of chasing of metal arts in Albania in the 5th-7th centuries. A bronze griffin from the 4th to 7th centuries was used as a leg of throne. Eloquent head of eagle, noted with fixed gaze to the fourth, big predatory beak and alerted sharp ears, crowns a vigorous trunk of lion. Ornamental bronze bird from Chardakhly village should also be mentioned.

=== Dishes ===
Decorative and ornamental adornments of the bronze plates of the 6th and 7th centuries from the southern Dagestan, consist of stylized flowers and branches arranging various medallions and concentric circles. Ornamental medallions are placed around the central medallion, on a circular line, above which comes a chain of concentric circles. Extreme line is adorned with big medallions. Six three-leafed flowers, which were placed around a hexagon, are the main ornamental motif of the neutral medallion. Widely spread three-leafed figurative motif is considered the image of a “holy tree”, which became the ornamental motif of decorative adornments of bronze items and architectural details of the examined period (1st to 7th centuries).

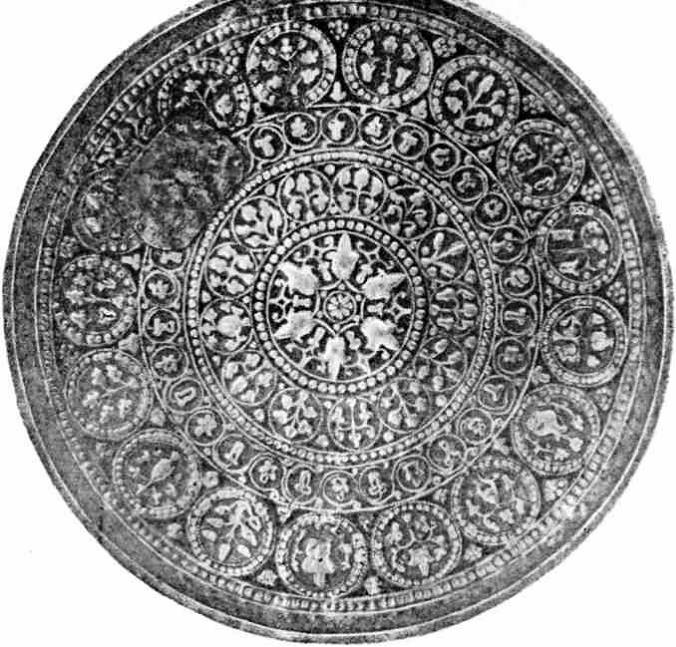
Bronze plate of the 6th or 7th century from Dagestan. Hermitage Museum.

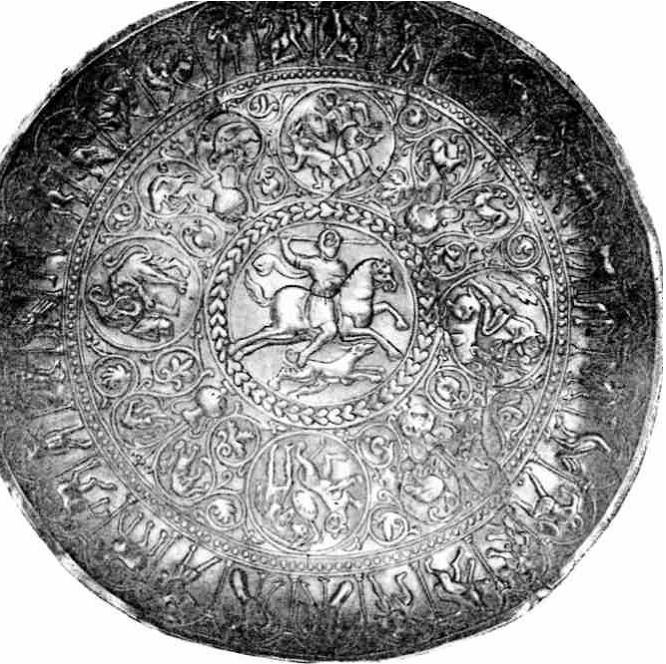
Bronze plate of the 4th or 5th century from Dagestan. Hermitage Museum.

Another bronze plate from the 4th or 5th century from southern Dagestan is called a splendid piece of art of toreutics of Caucasian Albania. A galloping rider with helmet depicted in the central circle is accompanied by dog, which was depicted as moving forth in leaps and bounds. Flying in the air scarf of the rider reminds of "imperial ribbon" adorning relief image of two peacocks on stone of an ancient temple of 5th or 6th century of Mingachevir. It is considered that, the eastern motifs prevail over the ancient ones. Weaving of ancient and the "eastern" elements in ornaments and garment had been traced there – Roman garment of struggling people in the medallions and the eastern costumes of dancers under the arches.

=== Pitchers ===
The trunk of one pitcher from the 6th or 7th century from the southern Dagestan is covered with a stylized plant ornament, which is enlivened by incrustation with red copper. The handle of the bronze pitcher is adorned with a three-leafed ornamental motif. There are chevrons on the front side, under the spout and on the back side, under the handle, which enriches the whole ornamentation of the pitcher with its medallions. It is also noted that the most complex many leafed picture of the holy tree on the bronze pitcher with nose of 6th or 7th century, where the main part of the composition consists of a three-leafed picture of the tree, which turned into five-leafed palmette in the 6th to 7th centuries. The picture is located under the nose, on the vertical axis of the dish cast like a waxy model. Its artistic composition creates isosceles triangle which harmonizes with pear-like shape of the dish. Aesthetic impression increases with incrustation of red copper and yellow bronze and with two images of peacocks, which is considered the symbol of fire and the Sun, and which is surrounded by holy trees. Images of puffy figures of the birds keep the general interpretation of the thing, the plastic construction of which is harmonized with imaginary motifs. Reminding the Sasanids’ pitchers, it differs for more heavier trunk, solidity of the handle and the nose of whisk. Holy birds with necklaces and waving scarves, which were divided by conditionally interpreted tree, are depicted on the trunk with not high relief.

=== Jewelry ===
Activity of masters in artistic handling of metal in Caucasian Albania and in creation of samples of jewelry art, archaeological materials, consisting of rich variety of creations of jewelry art, makes to characterize such kind of arts as one of the most developed kinds of arts of that period. Different earrings, diadems, necklaces, beads, pendants, fibulas, buttons, clasps, bracelets, seal rings, belt buckles, belt sets and others gives a good presentation about a large diapason of creativity of jewelers of Caucasian Albania. Two periods can be distinguished in development of jewelry art in Caucasian Albania: the first from the 4th century BC – 1st century AD and the second from the 1st - 7th centuries AD. Production of such kinds of jewelry art as pendants, plaques, buttons, earrings, diadems, necklaces, bracelets and others are typical for the first period. The second period is considered the most developed because of richness of artistic and plastic forms and for use of different technology. For example, 22 burials were opened on the left shore of the Kura River, in Sudagylan (near Mingachevir), during 1949-1950, in log cabins. Jewelry items made of gold and silver, golden beads, seal rings with mounting seals are also enumerated in report.

=== Earrings ===
Earrings of the first period have different geometric shapes, but almost always their ends are made in shape of stylized snake heads with through holes, which witness preservation of a strong influence of cultic ideas. Upper bail preserved its initial round shape during this period. Shapes of bails were not changed in the second period, too. But the lower part of earrings – pendant changed to different forms.

Moon like earrings which appeared at the end of the first period, in the 1st century BC, are considered more primitive jewelry items and were broadly spread in the second period, especially in the 1st and 2nd centuries.

Golden earring, which were found in Kalagya village of Ismayilli rayon in 1938, by V.A.Pakhomov are dated back to the beginning of our era. Earrings with pendants consisted of four poured grains located in pyramidal shape of the 3rd-1st centuries BC, which were found in Yaloylutepe in 1951, are also very interesting. In construction of the earrings found in Mingachevir, related to the 1st century AD, a bail is apart from the pendant. These golden rings are consisted of fair plates in shape of circle.

=== Necklaces ===
Beads of the 1st century BC - 1st century AD from jar burials, excavated in 1948, by G.P.Ione in Mingachevir

Three kinds of necklaces from the 5th to 3rd centuries BC were found in Mingachevir: figured, spherical and cylindrical shaped with beads. Beads had been made of two soldered plates of low-carat gold. Beads were decorated by stamping method with four horizontal relief lines. Necklace was one of mostly spread kinds of neck jewelry in Caucasian Albania. A necklace consisting eleven beads made of gold and related to the 2nd to 5th centuries was found in Mingachevir by archaeologist H.M. Aslanov. The beads consist of two parts soldered across horizontal axis of the item have biconical shape with wrapped ends of whisk. Albanian jewelers made stone beads with magic character besides golden ones. Cylindrical and spherical shaped stone beads of Mingachevir made of cornelian, sardonyx, pyrite, lapis lazuli, serpentine were thoroughly inspected by G.G.Lemmleyn.

== Literature ==
- Н. И. Рзаев. Искусство Кавказской Албании (IV в. до н. э. — VII в. н. э.). / Академия наук Азербайджанской ССР, Институт архитектуры и искусства, под ред. А. В. Саламзаде — Баку: Элм, 1976. — 138 с.
- К. В. Тревер. Очерки по истории и культуре Кавказской Албании IV в. до н. э.-VII в. н. э. — Москва-Ленинград: Издательство Академии наук СССР, 1959. — 389 с.
- Кемал Алиев. Античная Кавказская Албания. — Баку: Азербайджанское издательско-полиграфическое объединение, 1992. — 238 с.
- З. И. Ямпольский. Вопросы истории Кавказской Албании. Сборник статей. — Баку: Азербайджанское издательско-полиграфическое объединение, 1962.
- Халилов Д. А. Раскопки на городище Хыныслы, памятнике древней Кавказской Албании. — 1962.
