= Şahbəyli, Agsu =

Şahbəyli
- Municipality
- Location within Azerbaijan
- Coordinates: 40°28′22″N 48°23′58″E
- Country: Azerbaijan
- Rayon: Agsu

Population
  - Total: 291
- Time zone: UTC+4 (AZT)
  - Summer (DST): UTC+5 (AZT)

Şahbəyli (also, Şahboyli, Shakhbeyli, Shebali, and Shebaly) is a village and municipality in the Agsu Rayon of Azerbaijan. It has a population of 291.
