= Hacıqədirli, Agsu =

Hacıqədirli
- Municipality
- Location within Azerbaijan
- Coordinates: 40°31′N 48°14′E
- Country: Azerbaijan
- Rayon: Agsu

Population
  - Total: 298
- Time zone: UTC+4 (AZT)
  - Summer (DST): UTC+5 (AZT)

Hacıqədirli (also known as Gadzhi-Kadyrli, Gadzhykadirli, and Saran-Khadzhi-Kadyr) is a village and municipality in the Agsu Rayon of Azerbaijan. It has a population of 298.
