= Xınıslı =

- Municipality
- Location within Azerbaijan
- Coordinates: 40°19′37″N 48°17′09″E
- Country: Azerbaijan
- Rayon: Kurdamir

Population
  - Total: 1,970
- Time zone: UTC+4 (AZT)
  - Summer (DST): UTC+5 (AZT)

Xınıslı (also, Khynysly) is a village and municipality in the Kurdamir Rayon of Azerbaijan.
