= Zərdab, Agsu =

Zərdab
- Location within Azerbaijan
- Coordinates: 40°32′N 48°09′E
- Country: Azerbaijan
- Rayon: Agsu
- Time zone: UTC+4 (AZT)
  - Summer (DST): UTC+5 (AZT)

Zərdab (also, Zardob) is a village in the Agsu Rayon of Azerbaijan.
