= Aratlı-Curuğlu =

- Municipality
- Location within Azerbaijan
- Coordinates: 40°30′N 48°25′E
- Country: Azerbaijan
- Rayon: Agsu

Population
  - Total: 556
- Time zone: UTC+4 (AZT)
  - Summer (DST): UTC+5 (AZT)

Aratlı-Curuğlu (known as İkinci Aratkənd until 1992) is a village and municipality in the Agsu Rayon of Azerbaijan. It has a population of 556.
