= Həmzəli, Qubadli =

Həmzəli
- Location within Azerbaijan
- Coordinates: 39°18′39″N 46°42′35″E
- Country: Azerbaijan
- District: Lachin

Population (2015)
  - Total: 106
- Time zone: UTC+4 (AZT)

Həmzəli (Hamzali) is a village in the Lachin District of Azerbaijan.

== History ==
The village was located in the Armenian-occupied territories surrounding Nagorno-Karabakh, coming under the control of ethnic Armenian forces during the First Nagorno-Karabakh War in the early 1990s. The village subsequently became part of the breakaway Republic of Artsakh as part of its Kashatagh Province, referred to as Getamej (Armenian: Գետամեջ). It was recaptured by Azerbaijan during the 2020 Nagorno-Karabakh war.
