= Hacıqədirli, Shamakhi =

Hacıqədirli
- Municipality
- Location within Azerbaijan
- Coordinates: 40°24′57″N 48°33′59″E
- Country: Azerbaijan
- Rayon: Shamakhi

Population
  - Total: 514
- Time zone: UTC+4 (AZT)
  - Summer (DST): UTC+5 (AZT)

Hacıqədirli (also, Adzhikadiry, Gadzhi-Kadirli, and Gadzhykadirli) is a village and municipality in the Shamakhi Rayon of Azerbaijan. It has a population of 514.
