= Gürcüvən, Shamakhi =

Gürcüvən
- Location within Azerbaijan
- Coordinates: 40°39′N 48°29′E
- Country: Azerbaijan
- Rayon: Shamakhi
- Time zone: UTC+4 (AZT)
  - Summer (DST): UTC+5 (AZT)

Gürcüvən (also, Gyurdzhivan) is a village in the Shamakhi Rayon of Azerbaijan.
