= Həmzəli, Qabala =

Həmzəli
- Municipality
- Location within Azerbaijan Location within Shaki-Zagatala Economic Region
- Coordinates: 41°00′09″N 47°48′19″E
- Country: Azerbaijan
- Rayon: Qabala

Population
  - Total: 1,367
  - Density: 20.66/km^{2} (53.5/sq mi)
- Time zone: UTC+4 (AZT)

Həmzəli (also, Gamzali and Həmzəlli) is a village and municipality in the Qabala Rayon of Azerbaijan. It has a population of 1,367.

The village of Həmzəli is based on the river Həmzəliçay, 'çay' meaning river. Some tourist destinations, including the Gabala Shooting Club, are located in Həmzəli. The village is situated at the base of the Greater Caucasus mountains. Local hospitality spots for tourists, such as the Həmzəli Garden, picturesque locations like the Nohur Lake and the Seven Beauties waterfall are also located in Həmzəli.
