= Torpaggala =

- Torpaqqala
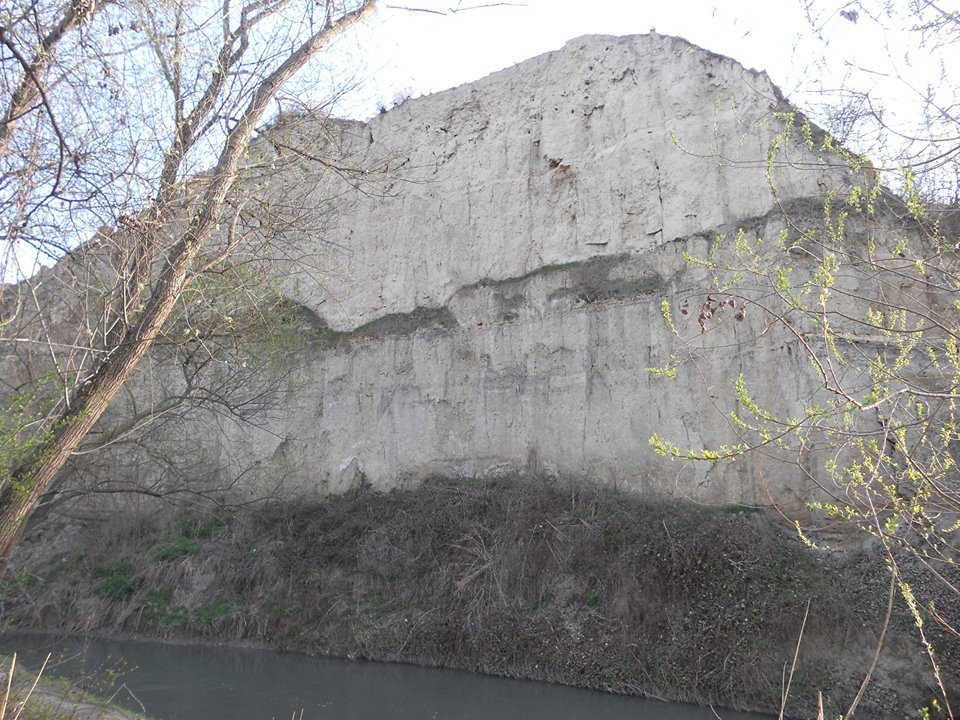
- Interactive map of the Torpaggala area

General information
- Type: Habitation
- Architectural style: Albanian architecture
- Location: Qakh, Azerbaijan

Torpaggala is a habitation of early Middle Ages in Azerbaijan. The monument is located on the left bank of Alazani River on the same named hill, south-west of the present Qakh. The longitudinal plan is 500–510 m in the north-east and south-west of the hill and 150–160 m in width. The total area is 1.5 hectares.

== Design ==
In Torpaggala, various remains of buildings, clay ovens and fireplaces, industrial buildings, farm cubes, pottery and glassware and bone residues were found.

The five rooms (all rooms were burned) discovered at the VII excavation site of Torpaggala, were made of bricks and wood material was used on the ceiling. A large number of mica were found in the hearth. Rashid Goyushov notes that it appears that mica was used to tan the pelt and to whitewash walls.

Studies have shown that there was a special craft neighborhood in Torpaggala. Here are two pieces of pottery and brick, as well as glass furnaces. Pottery furnaces are elliptic and have two halves. On both furnaces, ceramic plates were produced. The brick cooking area is the only building material found in the archaeological excavations in Transcaucasia.

The most unique remnants in Torpaggala are rare glass furnaces. A large number of glass residues were found in this quadrangular formed object.

Different types of graves were found beneath the place of residence, and the Christian graves were discovered in the area near the territory called Saggizlig. This indicates that these graves belong to Caucasian Albanians.

There is a cultural layer of 2–4 meters thick, covering the III-XV centuries in Torpaggala. 1.5–2 meters high defence barrier, cultural layer, as well as household items, pottery and glass furnaces have allowed scientists to call this place a residence place. It is supposed that Torpaggala territory has some early medieval city belonging to Caucasian Albanians.

== See also ==
Architecture of Azerbaijan
