= Həmzəli, Nakhchivan =

Həmzəli
- Municipality
- Location within Azerbaijan
- Coordinates: 39°34′07″N 45°06′05″E
- Country: Azerbaijan
- Autonomous republic: Nakhchivan
- District: Sharur

Population (2005)
  - Total: 734
- Time zone: UTC+4 (AZT)

Həmzəli (also, Hamzali and Gamzali) is a village and municipality in the Sharur District of Nakhchivan Autonomous Republic, Azerbaijan. It is located 14 km in the east from the district center, on the bank of the Akhura River (tributary of Arpachay), at the foothill area. Its population is busy with grain-growing and animal husbandry. There are secondary school, library, club and a medical center in the village. It has a population of 734.

== Etymology ==
The village was built by the families of həmzəli generation. And therefore it was named as Hamzali. It is an Ethnotoponym.
