= Bëyuk-Sovla =

- Location within Azerbaijan Location within Karabakh Economic Region
- Coordinates: 40°19′N 47°25′E
- Country: Azerbaijan
- Rayon: Barda
- Time zone: UTC+4 (AZT)
  - Summer (DST): UTC+5 (AZT)

Bëyuk-Sovla is a village in the Barda Rayon of Azerbaijan.
