= Nüydi =

- Municipality
- Location within Azerbaijan
- Coordinates: 40°31′48″N 48°38′12″E
- Country: Azerbaijan
- Rayon: Shamakhi

Population
  - Total: 632
- Time zone: UTC+4 (AZT)
  - Summer (DST): UTC+5 (AZT)

Nüydi (also, Nyugdi, Nyugdy, and Nyuydi) is a village and municipality in the Shamakhi Rayon of Azerbaijan. It has a population of 632.
