= Kurdamir District =

District in central Azerbaijan

Coordinates: 40°20′24″N 48°09′36″E

- District
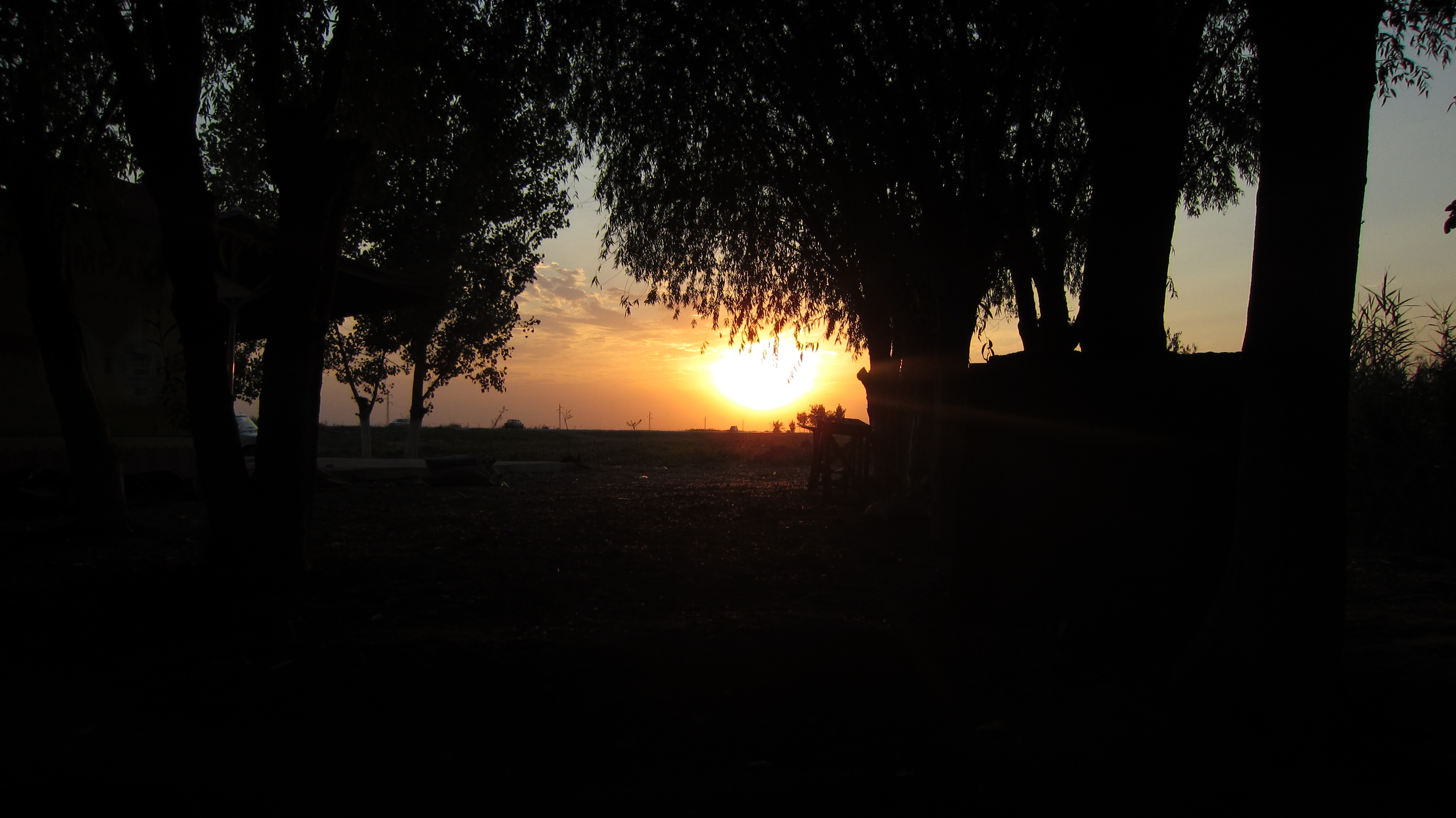

- Map of Azerbaijan showing Kurdamir District
- Country: Azerbaijan
- Region: Central Aran
- Established: 8 August 1930
- Capital: Kurdamir
- Settlements: 62

Government
  - Governor: Elkhan Ibrahimov

Area
  - Total: 1,630 km^{2} (630 sq mi)

Population (2020)
  - Total: 117,900
  - Density: 72.3/km^{2} (187/sq mi)
- Time zone: UTC+4 (AZT)
- Postal code: 3300
- Website: kurdemir-ih.gov.az

Kurdamir district (Azerbaijani: Kürdəmir rayonu) is one of the 66 districts of Azerbaijan. Located in the centre of the country, it belongs to the Central Aran Economic Region. The district borders the districts of Zardab, Ujar, Goychay, Ismayilli, Agsu, Hajigabul, Sabirabad, and Imishli. Its capital and largest city is Kurdamir. As of 2020, the district had a population of 117,900.

== Overview ==
The area of the district is 163,151 hectares (403,150 acres), which is 1.9% of the country's total territory. The district consists of 62 settlements.

The height above sea level is 200 meters, the average annual temperature is 17.18 °C, the average annual rainfall is 250–300 mm, and the region is dominated by a dry subtropical climate.

== Etymology ==
There is a suggestion that the name Kurdamir comes from the words "Kur" and "Damir" (in the Shirvan dialect the word "Kur" is used in the sense of "rabid, brave, valiant", and the word "Damir" refers to the leader of seven settlements based in this region, Damir). According to another version, the origin of the Kurdamir name is assumed to come from the words "Kur daimir", which means "not suffering disasters in the floods" of the Kura River. Subsequently, the letter "i" was assimilated, and the name of the territory was transformed into "Kurdamir".

== Geography ==
Kurdamir District is located in the northwest from Baku. It has a steppe climate. Its fauna is diverse – wild boars, wolves, foxes, jackals, pheasants, francolins, wild ducks, and geese can be found here. The rayon is famed for its vineyards, and “Shirvashahli” is its most popular sort of vine. Kurdamir District is also famed for its carpet-weaving traditions. “Shilyan” is the most popular type of local carpet in the world market. These carpets are woven in a village of the same name, which is not far from Kurdamir.

== Economy ==
It is mainly an agricultural district. Cotton growing, grain growing, and livestock, as well as viticulture and fishery, are essential. They deal with poultry and livestock in the district. There are wine and asphalt plants and flour factory. 43 km (III grade) of the Aghsu-Kurdamir-Bahramtapa highway, 42 km (II level) of the Alat-Gazimammad-Kurdamir-Yevlakh highway, and 44 km of Baku-Tbilisi main railway pass through the district.

In Kurdamir, there are 3 large state-owned enterprises and 10 large private enterprises.

From State Enterprises:

- "Kurdamir Regional Energy Supply" Limited Liability Company provides electricity to the population. 124 employees in the Kurdamir Distribution Network have been provided with permanent jobs.
- Kurdamir Gas Management Department provides natural gas supply to the population. Management employs 63 people.
- Kurdamir Su-Kanal administration implements the needs of the urban population for drinking water and provides sewage services. There are 37 permanent employees in management.

Private Businesses:

- "Kurdamir Pambig" Open Joint-Stock Company - production and processing of raw cotton,
- production and sale of alcoholic beverages - "Eastern Co LTD",
- Limited Liability Company "Eastern" Limited Liability Company - production and sale of pomegranate juice,
- "Kristal-Z" Limited Liability Company - fruit juice production and sale,
- "Qafqaz Lift Zavod" Limited Liability Company - production and sale of lifts,
- "Gelios" Limited Liability Company - production of fruit juices and wines.

360 people of the region were provided with permanent jobs in these enterprises. Among them, the "East Co LTD" limited liability company has created new vineyards and pomegranate plants. AVETA limited liability company has increased its production capacity to 500 tonnes per day.

The Ulusu sanatorium for 140 places has been functioning in Mollakand village since 1993. In that area in 1971, a water fountain had a temperature of 91 degrees Celsius. Hit a depth of 3500 meters. It has been found that it combines the quality of therapeutic waters of Truskavets, Kislovodsk, and other areas. The Kurdamir Olympic Sports Complex, which was constructed in 2008, covers 5.5 hectares. There is a swimming pool, 5 2-story cottages, a mini-football stadium, hand play courts, boiler-room, transformer substation. Kurdamir City Stadium is 4 hectares. The stands for 2,000 seats, 2-story tribune and courtroom, dressing rooms for the athletes, and sanitary nodes were built at the stadium.

== Population ==
According to the State Statistics Committee, as of 2018, the population of the city was 115,600 persons, which increased by 22,200 persons (about 23.7 percent) from 93,400 persons in 2000. Of the total population, 58,200 are men and 57,400 are women. More than 27.2 percent of the population (about 31,500 persons) consists of young people and teenagers aged 14–29.

The population of the district by the year (at the beginning of the year, thousand persons)
Territory	2000	2001	2002	2003	2004	2005	2006	2007	2008	2009	2010	2011	2012	2013	2014	2015	2016	2017	2018	2019	2020	2021
Kurdamir region	93,4	94,4	95,4	96,7	97,8	98,9	100,1	101,2	102,3	103,6	104,6	105,7	107,5	108,8	110,1	111,6	113,1	114,4	115,6	116,7	117,9	118,8
urban population	17,8	17,8	17,8	17,9	20,8	20,8	20,9	20,9	20,9	21,1	21,1	21,2	21,3	21,4	21,5	21,7	22,0	22,1	22,2	22,4	22,5	22,7
rural population	75,6	76,6	77,6	78,8	77,0	78,1	79,2	80,3	81,4	82,5	83,5	84,5	86,2	87,4	88,6	89,9	91,1	92,3	93,4	94,3	95,4	96,1
