= Agsu District =

District in eastern Azerbaijan

Coordinates: 40.5694°N 48.3999°E

- District
- Map of Azerbaijan showing Agsu District
- Country: Azerbaijan
- Region: Mountainous Shirvan
- Established: 8 October 1943
- Capital: Agsu
- Settlements: 80

Government
  - Governor: Rovshan Baghirov

Area
  - Total: 1,020 km^{2} (390 sq mi)

Population (2020)
  - Total: 81,000
  - Density: 79/km^{2} (210/sq mi)
- Time zone: UTC+4 (AZT)
- Postal code: 0600
- Website: agsu-ih.gov.az

Agsu District (Azerbaijani: Ağsu rayonu) is one of the 66 districts of Azerbaijan. It is located in the east of the country, in the Mountainous Shirvan Economic Region. The district borders the districts of Ismayilli, Shamakhi, Kurdamir, and Hajigabul. Its capital and largest city is Agsu. As of 2020, the district had a population of 81,000.

== History ==
According to some sources, Agsu city was founded by Nadir Shah, in 1735. The remains of that city ("Ruined City") are situated in the south of Agsu city. The name of the city is derived from "Agsuchay" which flows through the city. City status was given to Agsu, in 1967. Agsu district was arranged, in 1943. it is bounded by Ismayilli from the north and northwest, Shamakhi from the northwest and east, Kurdamir and Hajigabul from the south.

The district has 79 villages and 1 city. These dwelling areas are embraced by 24 territorial representations and 60 municipalities. Gagali, Kandoba, Bijo, Kalva, Pirhasanli, Jalayir, Padar, Arabushaghi, and Garagoyunlu are the biggest villages in the district.

== Education ==
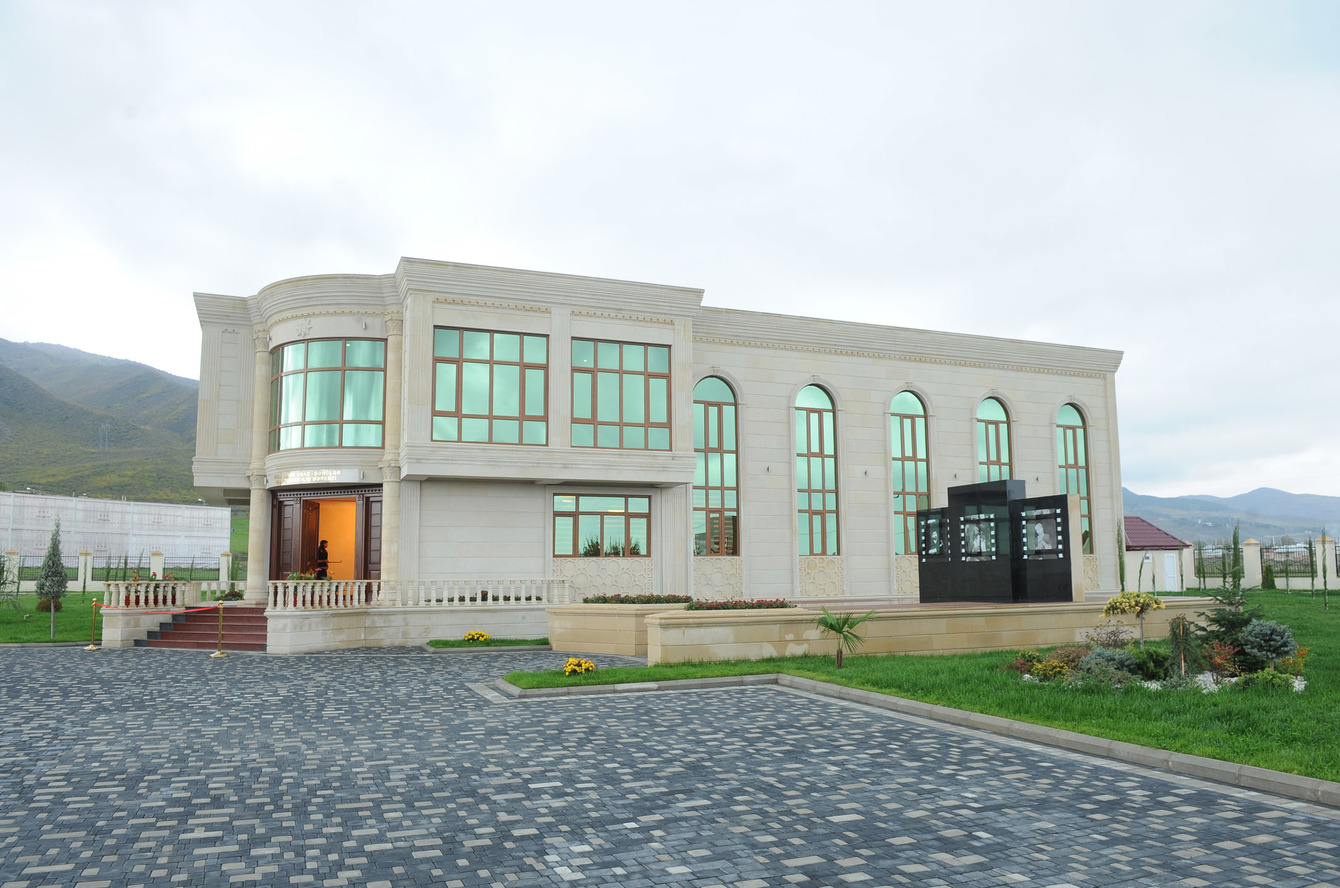
Children and Youth Art Center in Agsu

The district has 69 schools providing general education, 5 out-of-school and preschool institutes, 6 hospitals, 18 ambulatory-polyclinics, 22 doctor's assistant-mama dispensaries, a cultural palace, 10 cultural houses, 47 libraries, a music school for children, and a history-ethnographical museum.

In 1954, the first newspaper, "Yeni Hayat" ("New Life") was published in the district. Then, the inter-regional newspaper "Irali" ("Forward") was published in 1961 and the newspaper "Birlik" ("Unity") was published in 1966. Nowadays, the newspaper "Agsu" which is an agency of the executive government of the Agsu district, is published in the district. The newspaper was registered in the Ministry of Justice of the Azerbaijan Republic on January 13, 2003.

== Politics ==
Regional organization of 16 political parties and regional departments of 16 social-political organizations (including, 3 non-governmental organizations) operate in the district. The regional organization of New Azerbaijan Party in Agsu district takes an important role in the sociopolitical and cultural life of the district. The main organizations of YAP were founded in the district, in the beginning of 1993. The Constituent Assembly was held in November, 1993.

== Geography ==
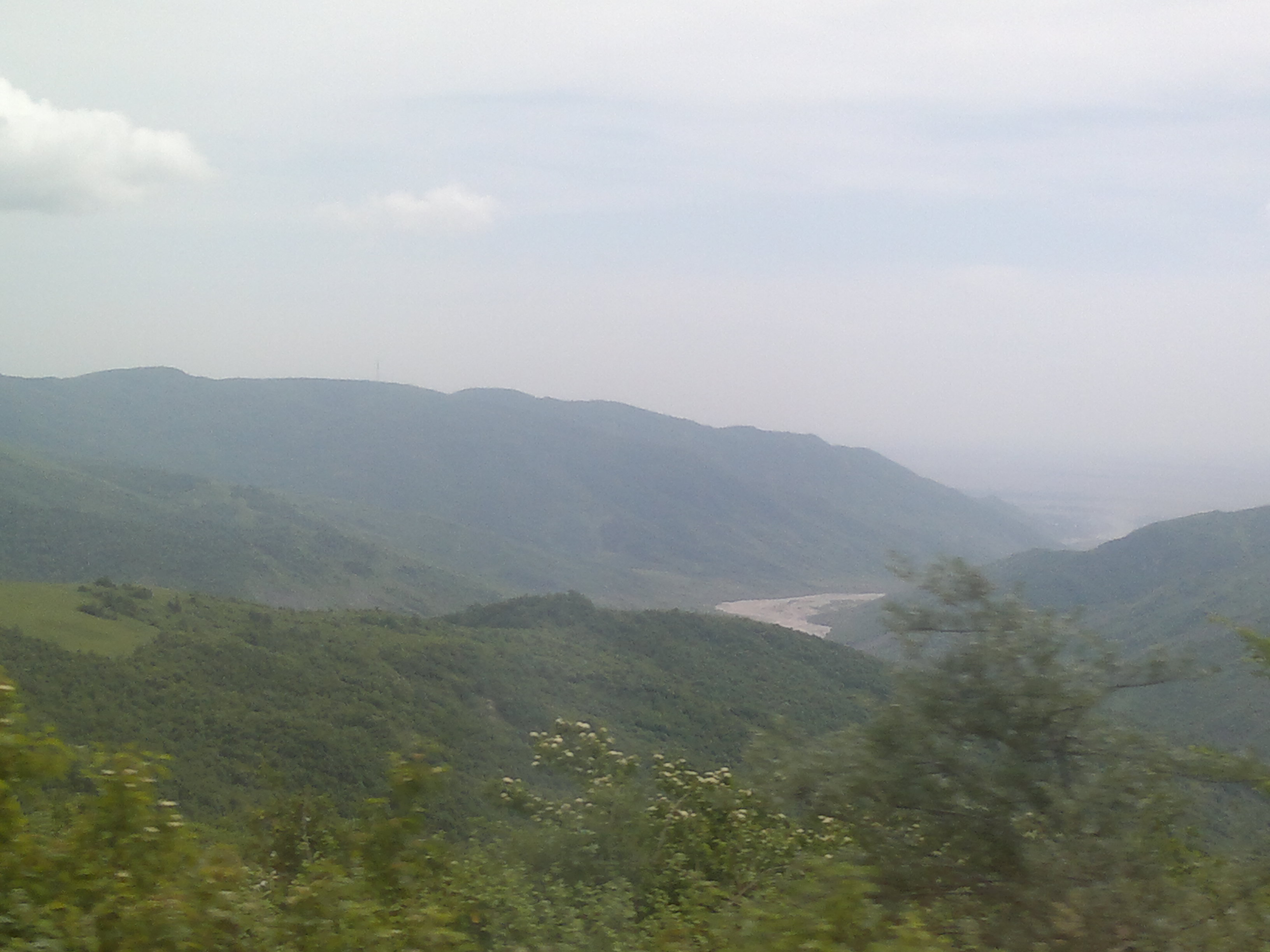
Nature of Agsu

Agsu District is located south of the Great Caucasian Mountains and on the plain of Shirvan. 6 villages, 3 territory units are mountainous. Relief of the district consists of mountainous, foothills and slanting flats. The mountainous zone is located at 700–1000m height above sea level. The relief of the mountainous zones is compounded with rivers, valleys, ravines. The Langabiz mountain chain is formed by small grey mountains from the banks of Goycay River to Pirsaatchay River. Its highest peak Sendelen (it is also known as "Sangalan" and "Bijo mountain") situated in the territory of Bijo village has the 929 m height above sea level.

The Girdiman and the Agsuchay and their branches flow through the district. Kukash gorge and Javanshir Lake (in the west), Yukhari Shirvan Canal and its branch Agsu (in the south) as well as little Bijoderesi river are located in the district.

The climate of the district is, semi-desert, dry grey. Winter months are usually mild, warm, and dry (the south), and summer months are usually mild, warm, and dry. Winter is dry, sunny, and less snowy. The average annual temperature is 13-14 C. average monthly relative humidity is 50-81% during the year. The annual quantity of rain is 400–600 mm.

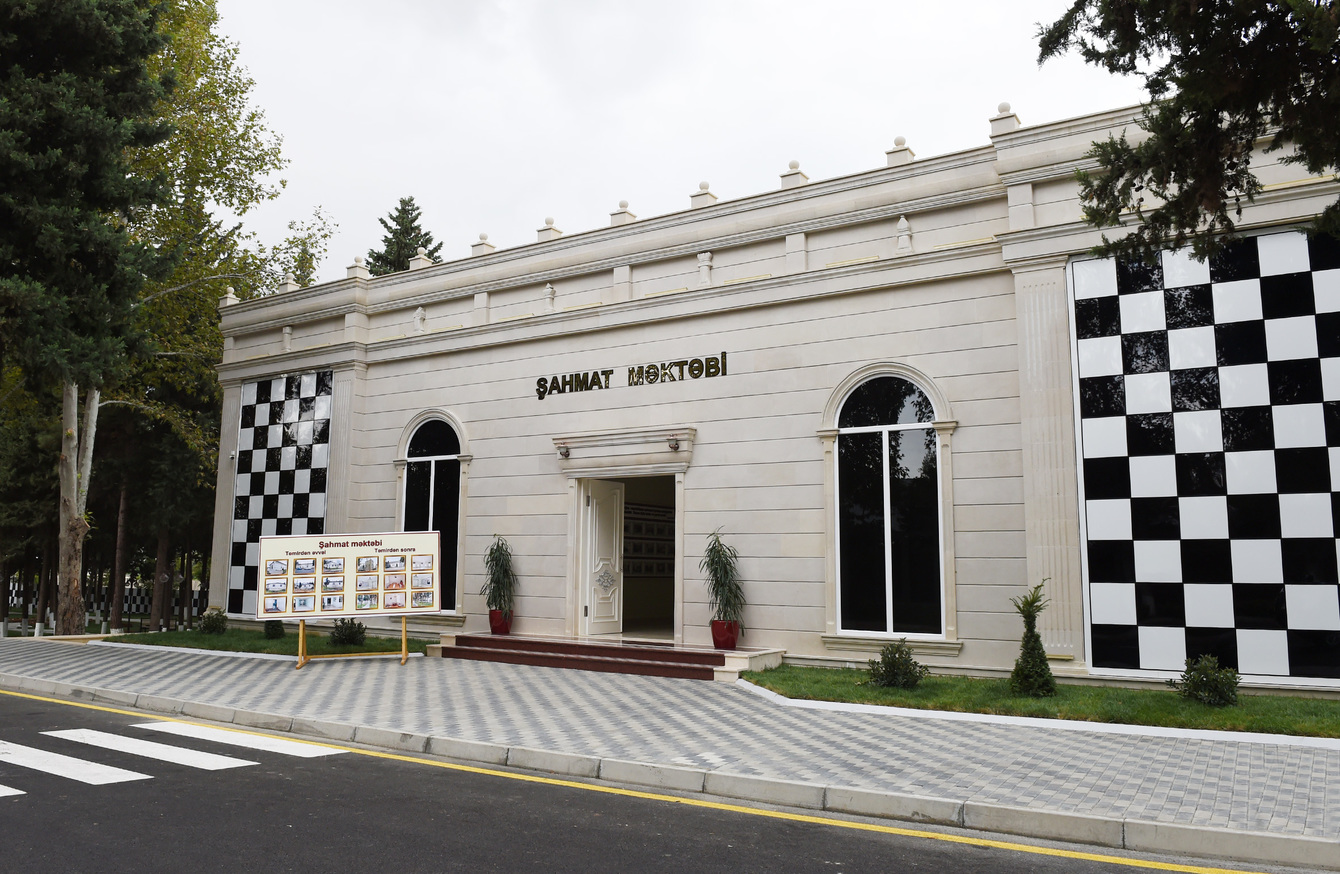
Aghsu Chess School

Agsuchay begins to flow from the Lahij Mountains. The middle flow of the rain is too deep, but it flows through a wide valley. The valley of the river loses its form beginning from Agsu city to the south. Here the river is used for irrigation of farming lands.

There are 55 km road of republican importance through the district. 37 km the road Baku-Shamakhi Yevlakh is a second categorical road, 18 km road Agsu-Kurdamir-Bahramtepe road is the third categorical road.

== Population ==
The population is 98.92% Azerbaijani and 1.08% Lezgin, Turkish and other. Of the population, 25.7% live in the city and 74.3% live in villages. The population is 49.1% male and 50.9% female.

The district has 2,068 IDPs and refugees, with most of them coming from Armenia, Uzbekistan and the Armenian-occupied territories surrounding Nagorno-Karabakh.

According to the State Statistics Committee, as of 2018, the population of city recorded 79,200 persons, which increased by 16,100 persons (about 25.5 percent) from 63,100 persons in 2000. Of the total population, 39,800 are men and 39,400 are women. More than 27.3 percent of the population (about 21,700 persons) consists of young people and teenagers aged 14–29.

The population of the district by the year (at the beginning of the year, thsd. persons)
Territory	2000	2001	2002	2003	2004	2005	2006	2007	2008	2009	2010	2011	2012	2013	2014	2015	2016	2017	2018	2019	2020	2021
Aghsu region	63,1	63,9	64,6	65,4	66,1	67,0	67,9	68,5	69,4	70,3	71,0	72,1	73,2	74,1	75,1	76,3	77,3	78,3	79,2	80,1	81,0	81,6
urban population	16,6	16,9	17,2	17,6	17,8	18,3	18,7	18,9	19,3	19,7	19,8	20,1	20,2	20,4	20,7	21,0	21,3	21,5	21,8	22,0	22,2	22,3
rural population	46,5	47,0	47,4	47,8	48,3	48,7	49,2	49,6	50,1	50,6	51,2	52,0	53,0	53,7	54,4	55,3	56,0	56,8	57,4	58,1	58,8	59,3

== Historical monuments ==
The statues of rams built in the Middle Ages brought great interest to the Agsu region. Even the figures of rams on the graves are observed in Padar village, and Mustafa village. In Azerbaijan, these kinds of statues can be found commonly. These types of grave monuments are widely used in the South Caucasus, East Anadolu, Middle Asia, Sibir, and Altay.

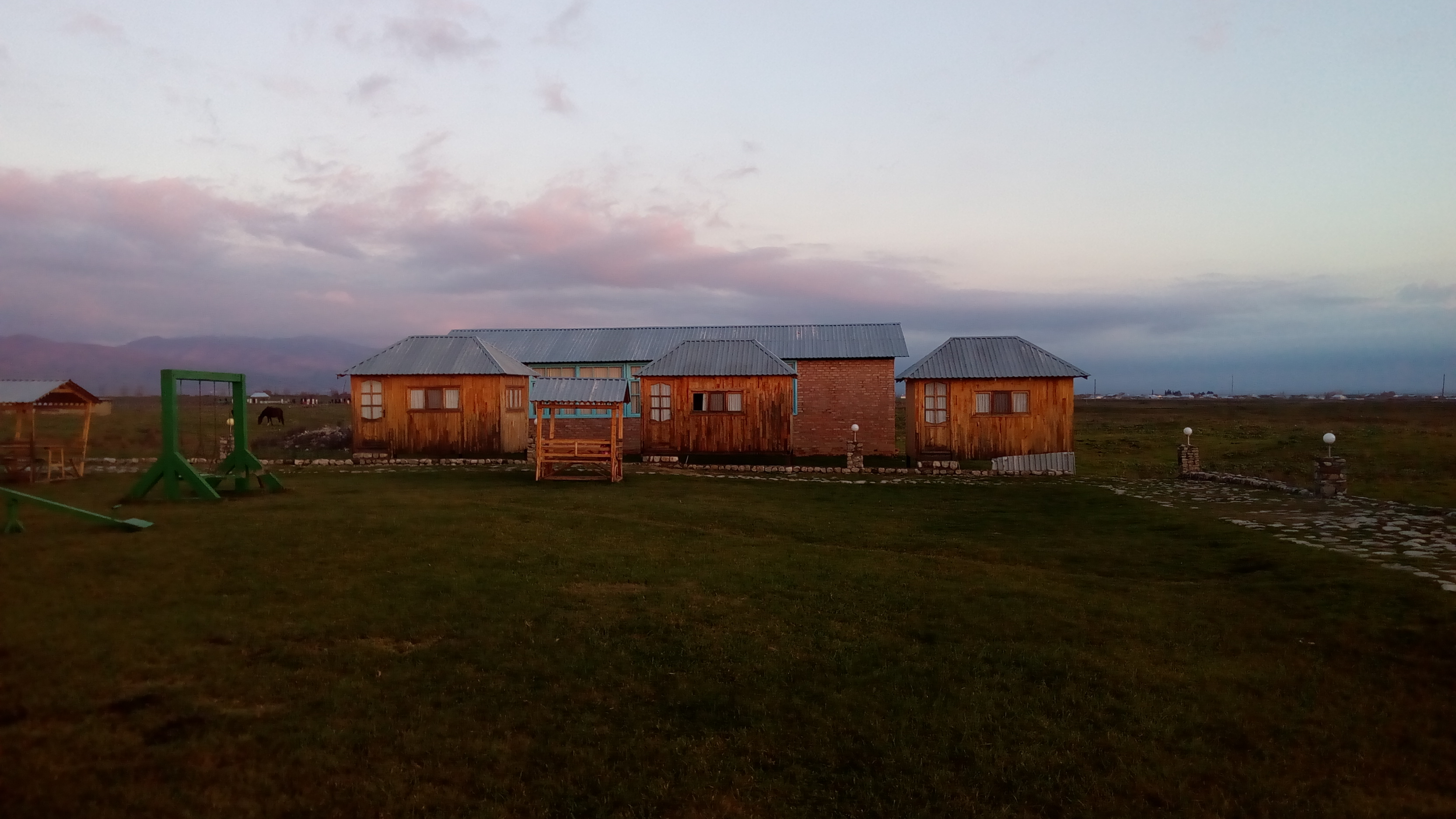
Agsu Medieval Ages Archaeological Tourism Complex

In ancient times, the ram was the symbol of abundance, victory, and strength. It should be mentioned that the early information about stone ram figures comes from the foreign travelers who visited Azerbaijan in the XIII-XIX centuries. These ram statues are related to the Middle Ages historical Azerbaijani governments Aghoyunlu and Garagoyunlu.

Sheikh Dursun Mausoleum (XV century), "Xəzinə dağı" (Treasure Hill) tower, Sheikh Amir Ahmed Mausoleum (1722), Pir Bakhtiyar Mausoleum (XVIII century) are among the historical monuments of Agsu district. The red dome and white dome are located in Garagoyunlu village. The walls of the Red Dome, constructed in 1869–1870 in an octahedral prism shape, were built of red-baked bricks. The white dome was built of white limestone in 1909.

== Culture and tourism ==
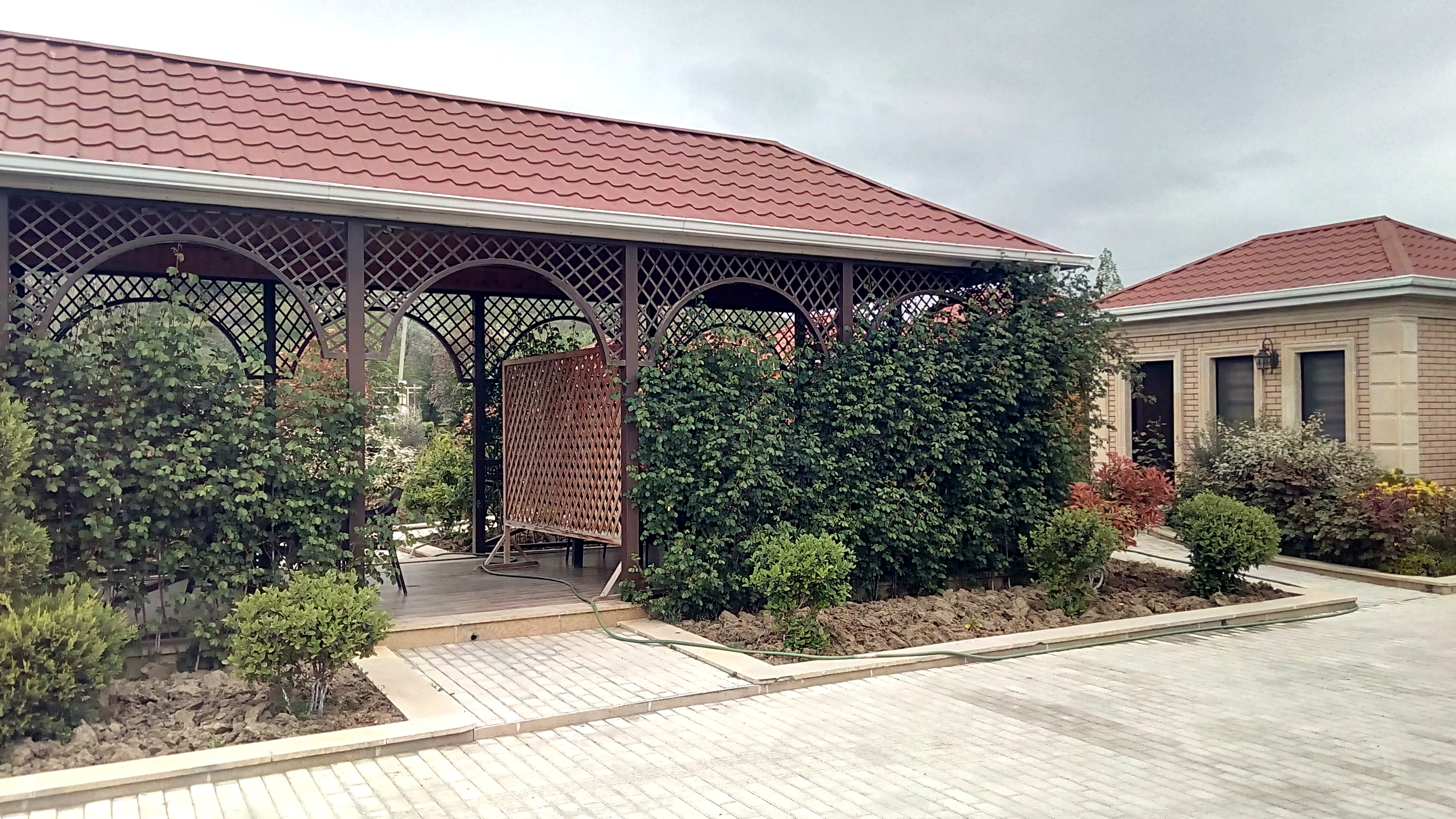
Ağsu - Nur Restoran 23.04.2021

The Agsu region has a number of amenities offering a wide range of services, such as the Agsu Region History and Ethnography Museum displaying archaeological artifacts dating back to the III-I centuries BC and other historical exhibits, Agsu Region Cultural Center featuring "Goncha" folk instrumental ensemble, "New Aghsu" vocal-instrumental ensemble. "Ashugs" ensemble, Ethnography Houses in Garagoyunlu, Padar and Bozavand villages, Craftsmanship centres in Bijo and Yenilik villages, Culture houses in Jalayir and Kalva villages, Agsu region Children's Music School, Agsu Chess School, Agsu Children and Youth Art Center, Agsu region Heydar Aliyev Center. There is also a stadium with a capacity of 3000 and a sports complex. "Agsu" newspaper is published in the region.

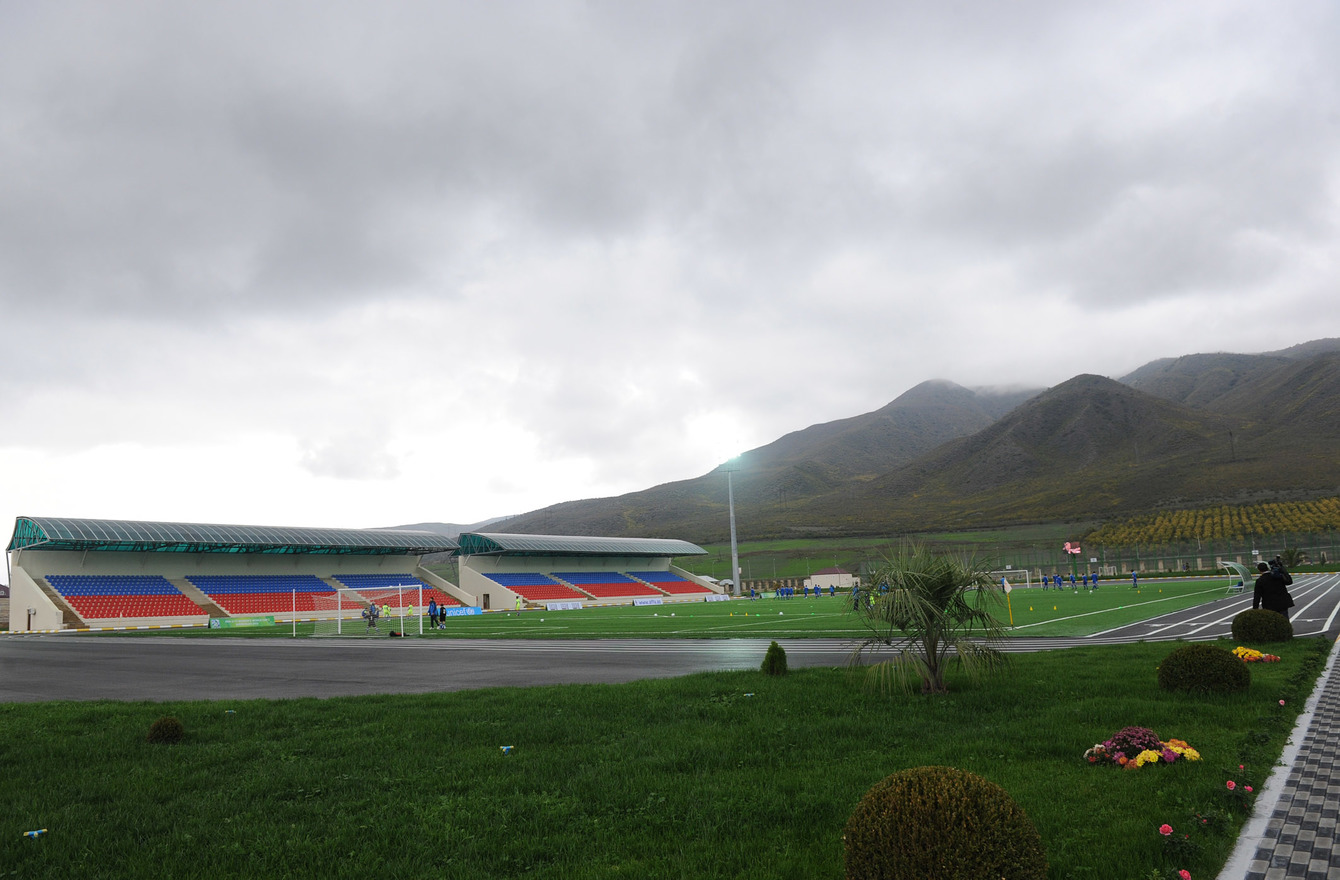
Agsu city stadium

== Agriculture ==
Agsu district is the agricultural district. Cattle-breeding, grain-growing, cotton-growing, fruit -growing, and vegetable-growing are the most important fields of the district's economy. 75.2% or 76742 hectare of its territory is useful for agriculture, 46.3% or 35550 hectares of it consists of arable land.

The economy of the district is arranged by agricultural activity. In 2007, the total output of the district was 55879.9 thousand manats, and 36685.8 thousand manats or 66 percent, fall to agriculture's share. Vegetable products of 21,644 thousand manats, cattle-breeding products of 15042 thousand manats were produced in the district.

36184-hectare arable lands were freely given to long-term 43892 proprietors as a result of carried out agrarian reforms in National Leader Heydar Aliyev's initiative and under his leadership. Property of sovkhozes and kolkhozes in the sum of AZM 17.8 billion (AZN 3.6mln.) was privatized and share permission was given to the proprietors. 98-100% of the production of the district, retail commodity circulation, paying services falls to the non-governmental sector's share.

=== Poultry ===
Development of poultry in the district was considered in the state program "Social-economic development of the regions of Azerbaijan Republic" (2004–2008 years). Inhabitants are busy with poultry in all zones. Three private incubation workshops seasonally operate in the district. The industrial method of poultry is under control. "Shaban-Poultry" LLC has operated in Musabeyli village since 2005. Birds for slaughter are bred in the establishment. Ten thousand birds were bred in the first quarter of the current year, and seven thousand of them were sold.

=== Cattle-breeding ===
Cattle-breeding dynamically develops in the district. Cattles are bred for dairy and slaughter. Two physical persons are busy cattle-breeding (including, one is busy with buffalo-breeding), one juridical person and three physical persons are busy with sheep-breeding. Domestic agriculture form and other forms of cattle-breeding rapidly develop in the district. There were 39235 cattle, 149679 sheep and goats in the district, on July 1, 2008. Cattle production also increased. 3939 ton (live) meat, 23302-ton milk and 274-ton wool were produced.

=== Plant-growing ===
Wheat, barley, alfalfa, maize, sunflower, watermelon, vegetables, sugar beets, potatoes, cotton, grapes, pomegranates, and other plants are cultivated in the district. In 2007, 80018-ton grain (in 27520-hectare area), 1032.1-ton cotton, 311.4-ton potato, 1818.6-ton vegetable, 3932.2-ton water-melon, 5053-ton fruit were cultivated in the district by private farmers and proprietors of individual plots. 81.6 thousand ton of grain was produced in the district till July 15, 2008. It's 1600 ton more than last year. The productivity indicator reached 29.3 quintals.
