= Azerbaijani culture =

Azerbaijani culture may refer to:

== Regions ==
- Culture of Azerbaijan

== Ethnic groups ==
- Azerbaijanis#Culture
  - Iranian Azerbaijanis#Culture
  - Azerbaijanis in Georgia#Culture
