= Mamedyarova =

Mamedyarova (also Mamedjarova or Mammadyarova, Azerbaijani: Məmmədyarova) is a feminine surname. Its masculine equivalent is Mamedyarov. Notable people with the surname include:

- Turkan Mamedyarova (born 1989), Azerbaijani chess player
- Zeinab Mamedyarova (born 1983), Azerbaijani chess player and sister of the above
