= Gasimushaghi carpets =

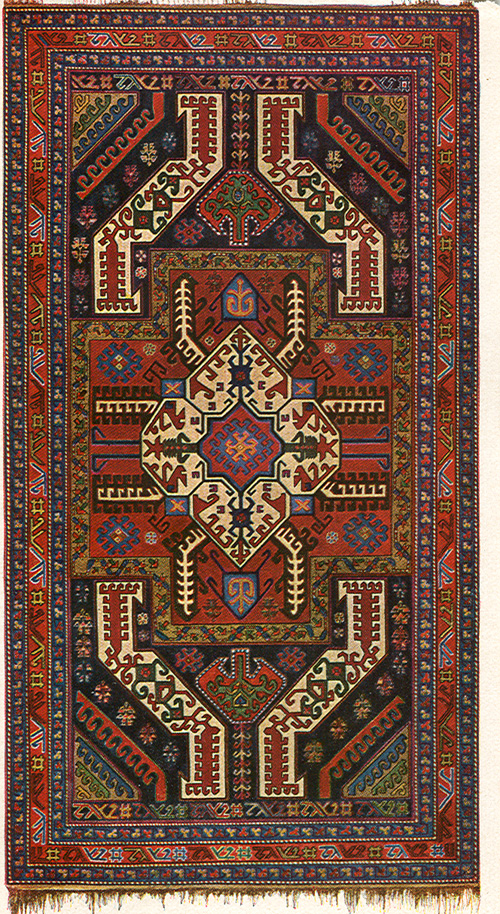
Azerbaijani "Gasimushaghi carpet" of the Karabakh School, late 19th century

Gasimushaghi carpets (Azerbaijani: Qasımuşağı xalçaları) are Azerbaijani pile carpets of the Karabakh school of the Jabrayil group.

== Carpets ==
Gasimushaghi carpets developed in a village called Gasimushaghi obasi and in Şamkənd, Ərikli, Kürdhacı, Chorman and Shalva villages.

Some centuries ago, ornaments of the “Gasimushaghi carpets” were used in embroidery and called “Gasimushaghi embroideries”. Then these embroidery ornaments were used in Gasimushaghi carpets and that is why these carpets are also called “Embroidery carpets”.

== Structure and technical features ==
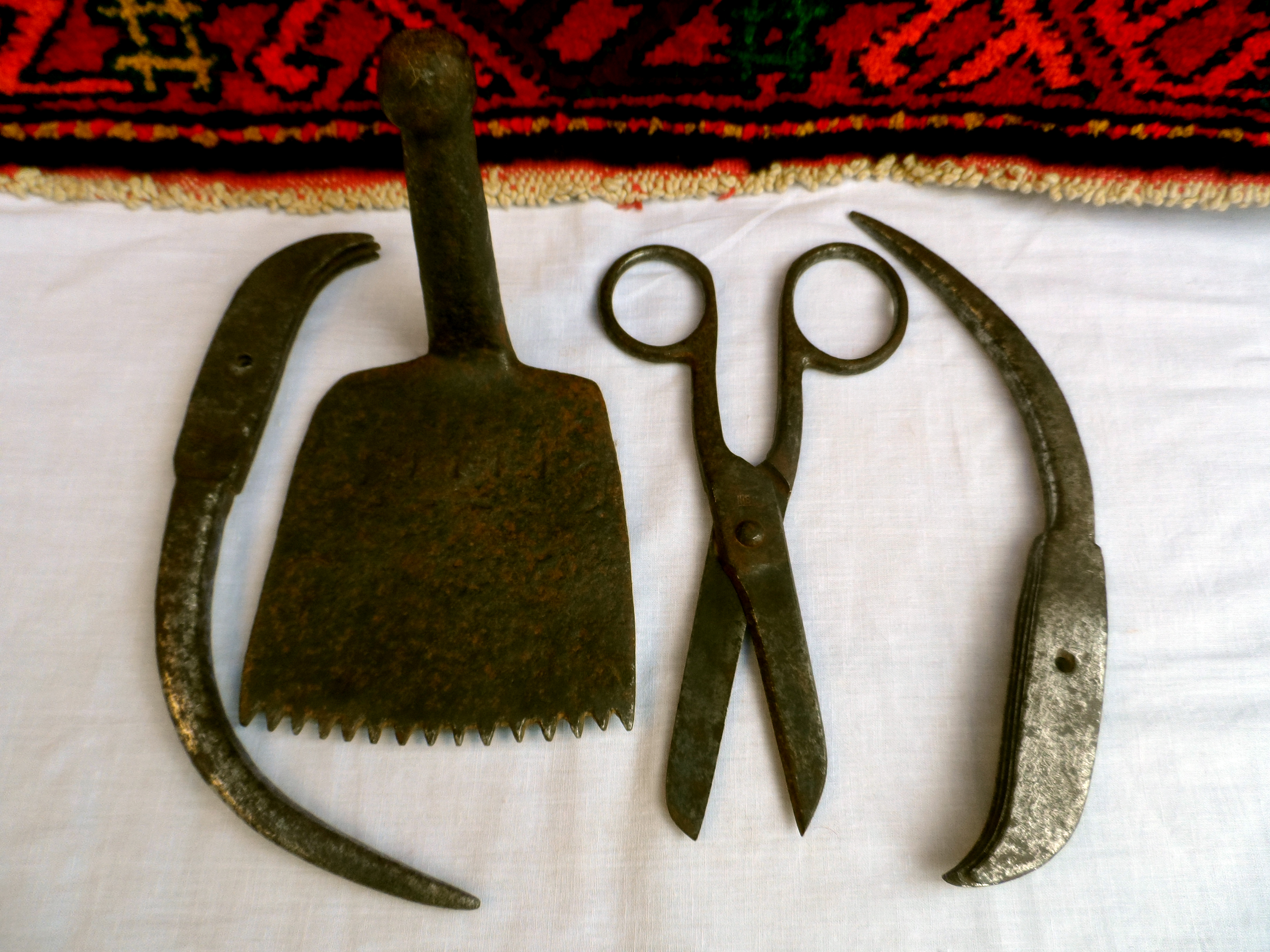
Carpet-weaving instruments used in "Gasimushaghi obasi" village.

Dimensions of Gasimushagi carpets are generally from 200x120 to 230x160, and sometimes larger. The density of the knots varies from 30x30 to 40x40 (from 90000 to 160000 knots in a sq.meter). The height of the wool is 7–10 mm.
