= Agir Karadagi =

Azerbaijani dance melody

Agir Karadagi (Azerbaijani: Ağır Qaradağı, meaning 'heavy Karadakhi') is an Azerbaijani melody of a dance that is created in Karadakh.

It is very popular in the cities Shaki and Zaqatala in northwestern Azerbaijan, and performed slowly.
