= Mammadyarov =

Mammadyarov, or Mamedyarov (Azerbaijani: Məmmədyarov), is a surname. Notable people with the surname include:

- Elmar Mammadyarov (born 1960), Azerbaijani diplomat
- Maharram Mammadyarov (1924–2022), Azerbaijani scientist
- Shakhriyar Mamedyarov (born 1985), Azerbaijani chess grandmaster

== See also ==
- Mamedyarova (Mammadyarova), the feminine form
