= Şamkənd =

- Location within Azerbaijan Location within East Zangezur Economic Region
- Coordinates: 39°52′41″N 46°25′00″E
- Country: Azerbaijan
- Rayon: Lachin
- Time zone: UTC+4 (AZT)
  - Summer (DST): UTC+5 (AZT)

Şamkənd (also, Shamkend) is a village in the Lachin Rayon of Azerbaijan.
