= Baku Khans' Palace =

- Bakı xanları sarayı کاخ خان‌های باکو
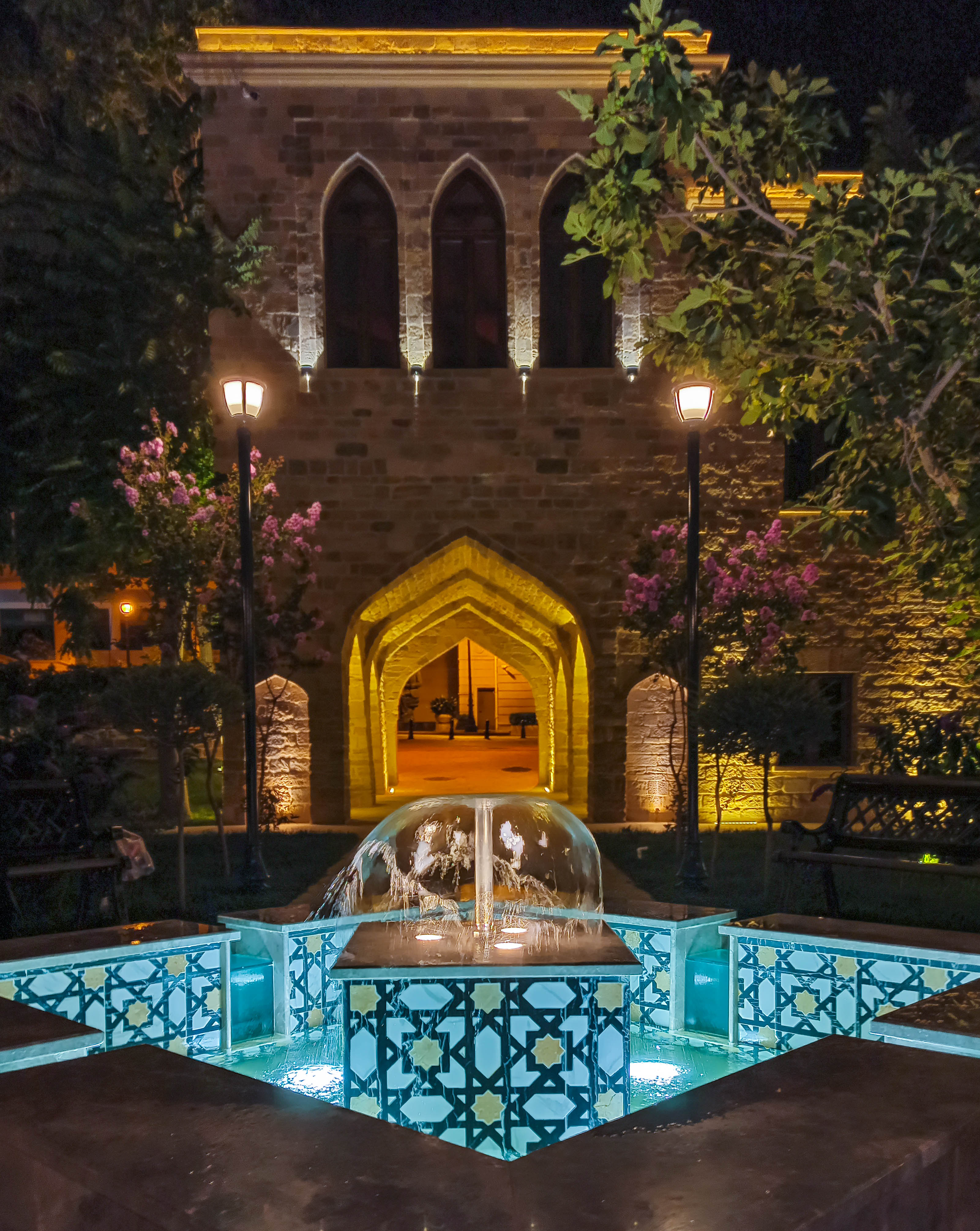
- One of the buildings, Boyuk Gala Street, 46.

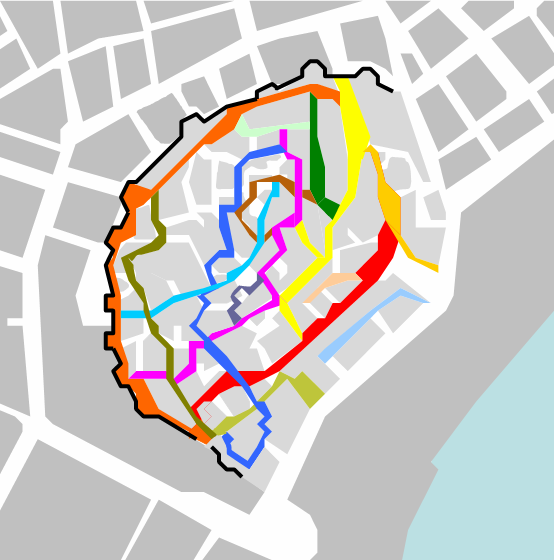
- Location within Streets in Old City, Baku, Azerbaijan

General information
- Architectural style: Typical Absheron house
- Location: Old City, Baku, Azerbaijan
- Coordinates: 40°22′05″N 49°50′12″E
- Construction started: 17th or 18th century

Baku Khans' Palace (Azerbaijani: Bakı xanları sarayı, Persian: کاخ خان‌های باکو) is a complex of several houses that belonged to the members of the ruling family of the Baku Khanate.

== Overview ==
The palace is located in the territory left of the Shamakhy gate. During the khanates period of Azerbaijan, which occurred after the collapse of the Shirvanshah state in the 17th century, Baku khans lived in this palace. No official information exists about the exact foundation date; however, it is estimated to be built around 1750 by the first Khan of Baku, Mirza Muhammad Khan I. The underground bathhouse is considered to be an older structure, being built around the 17th century. Upon the occupation of Baku by the Russian Empire in 1806, a military garrison was positioned in the palace. The palace used to have a garden with a pool and flowers that has now been reconstructed. Prior to the reconstruction, only the entrance portal and a small restored mosque had survived, while the underground bathhouse in the lower part of the fortress walls in the territory of the Khans' palace still remained unearthed. The latest excavations were in 1985, 1986, and 2018. Besides a lot of cultural samples, a water supply system and underground architectural constructions were also discovered here. Presently, the Palace complex consists of the house of the last Baku khan – Huseyngulu Khan as well as his family members, Abdurrahim bey and Mehdigulu bey.

== Nowadays ==
Prior to 2018, the palace complex was in ruins and parts of it still remained unearthed. The Official Administration of State Historical-Architectural Reserve "Icherisheher" informed media that they had no whatsoever intentions to repair the palace. However, they changed their position and issued a tender for the reconstruction of the historic palace complex in 2018. One of the main reasons for this decision is that the palace complex is seen as one of the most significant and valuable pieces of the architectural legacy of the Baku Khanate. Reconstruction work of the Baku Khans’ Palace-Museum began in March 2018. Khan's Garden surrounding the complex is also scheduled to be built and will become the largest garden park in Icherisheher. The archaeological excavations and restoration occurred from 2018 to 2019, and included clearing the earth from the complex as well as strengthening the dome and foundations using the original material. On June 29, 2020, Azerbaijani president Ilham Aliyev participated in the opening of the palace complex and 17th century underground bathhouse. As of August 2020, the palace has been fully reconstructed and the new Baku Khans’ palace-museum is now open to visitors.

== Residents ==
The following khans lived in the palace of Baku khans:

- 1747-1765 - Mirza Muhammad Khan I (son of Dergahqulu khan)
- 1765-1784 - Malik Muhammad Khan (son of Mirza Muhammad Khan I)
- 1784-1791 - Mirza Muhammad Khan II (son of Malik Muhammad Khan)
- 1791-1792 - Muhammadquli Khan (son of Mirza Muhammad Khan I)
- 1792-1806 - Huseyngulu Khan (son of Haji Aligulu Agha Khan).

== Gallery ==
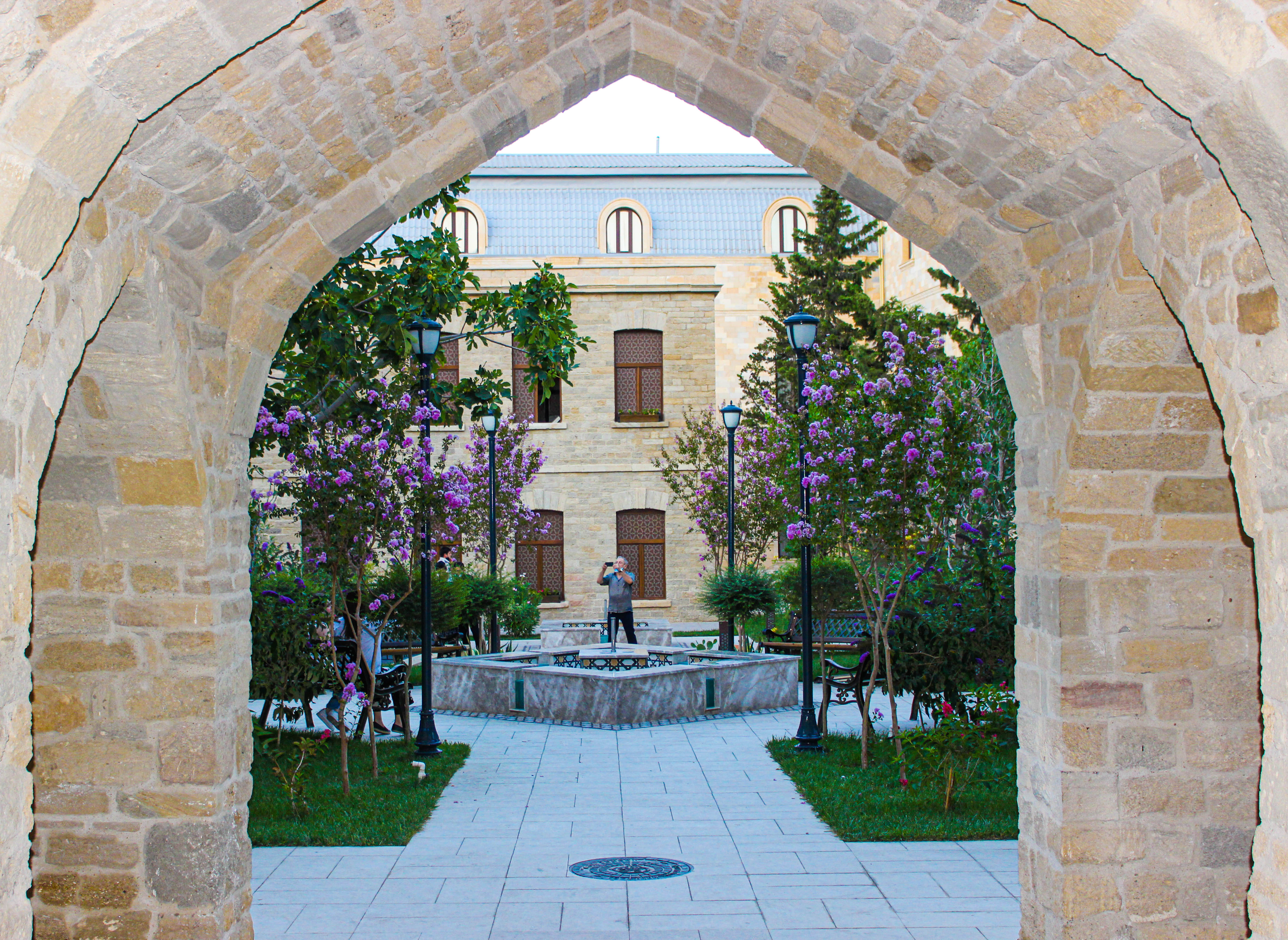

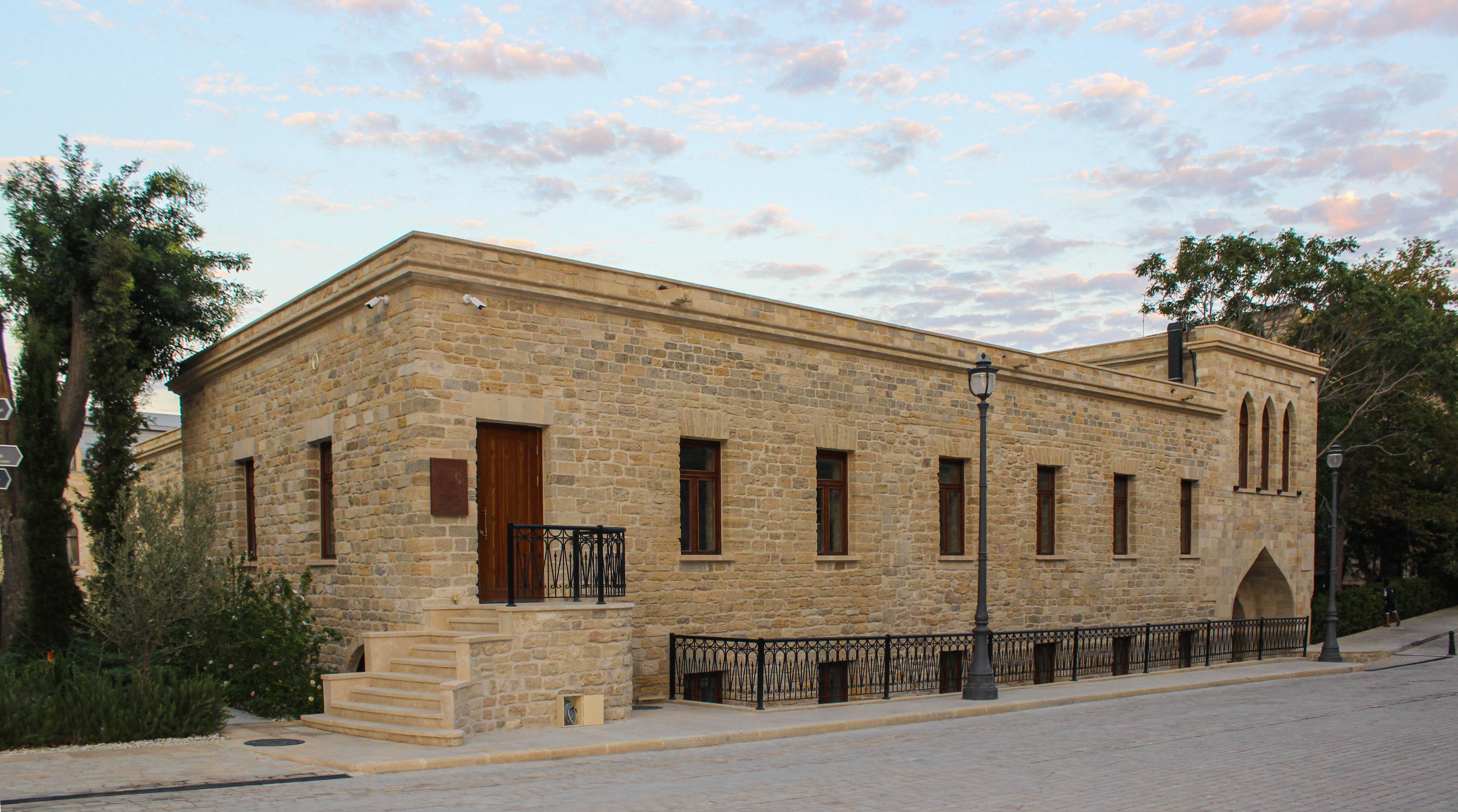

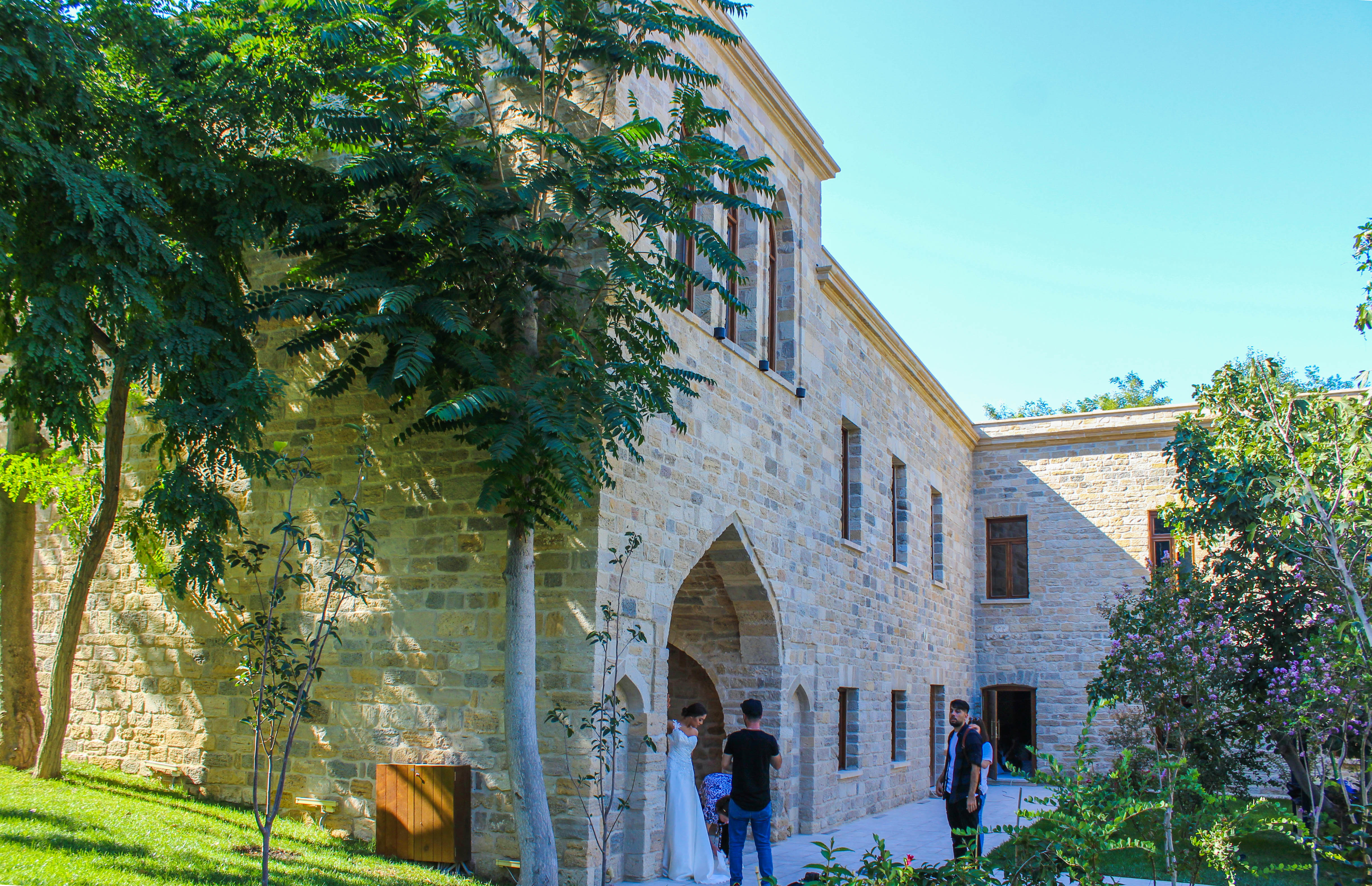

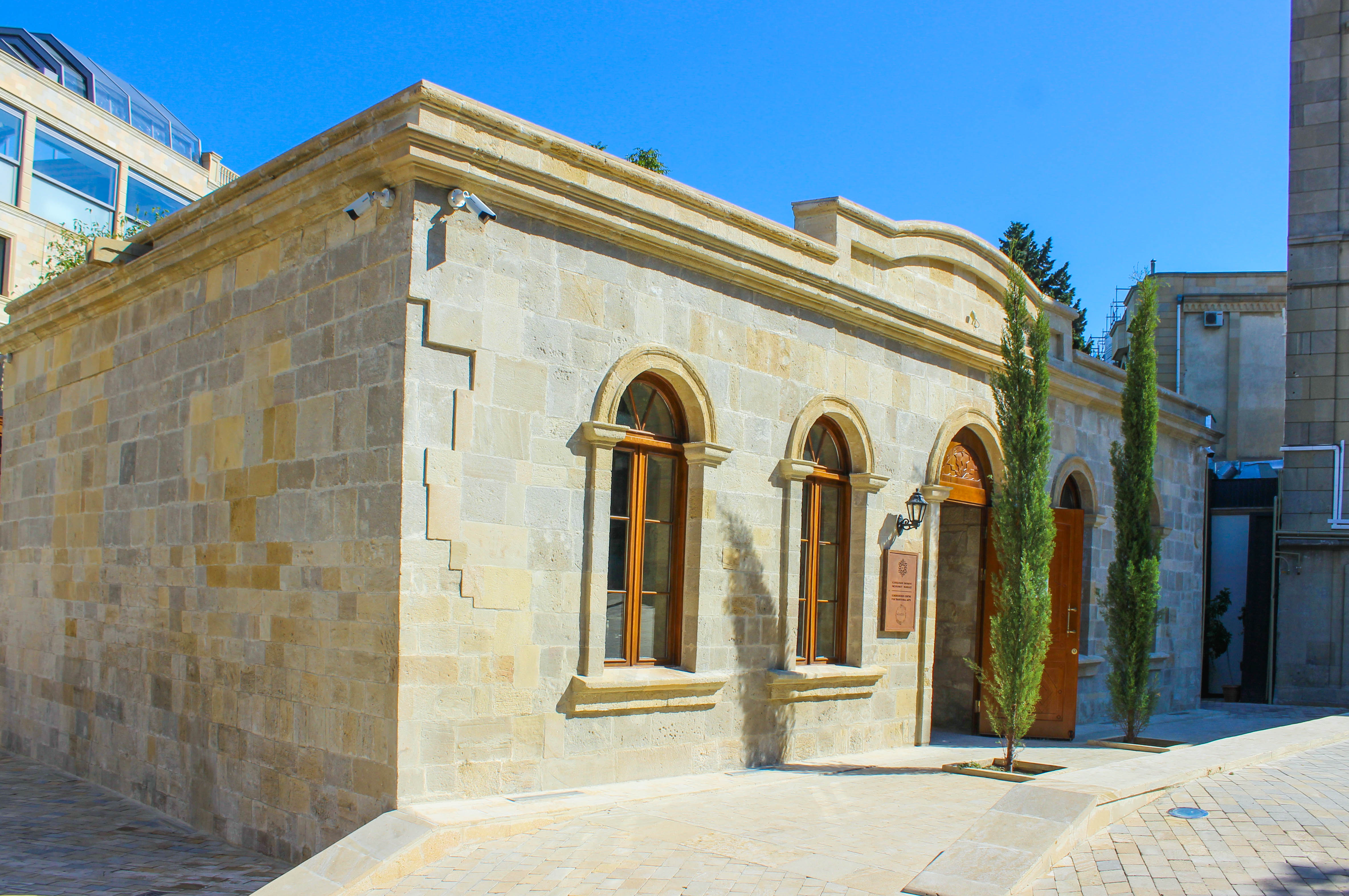

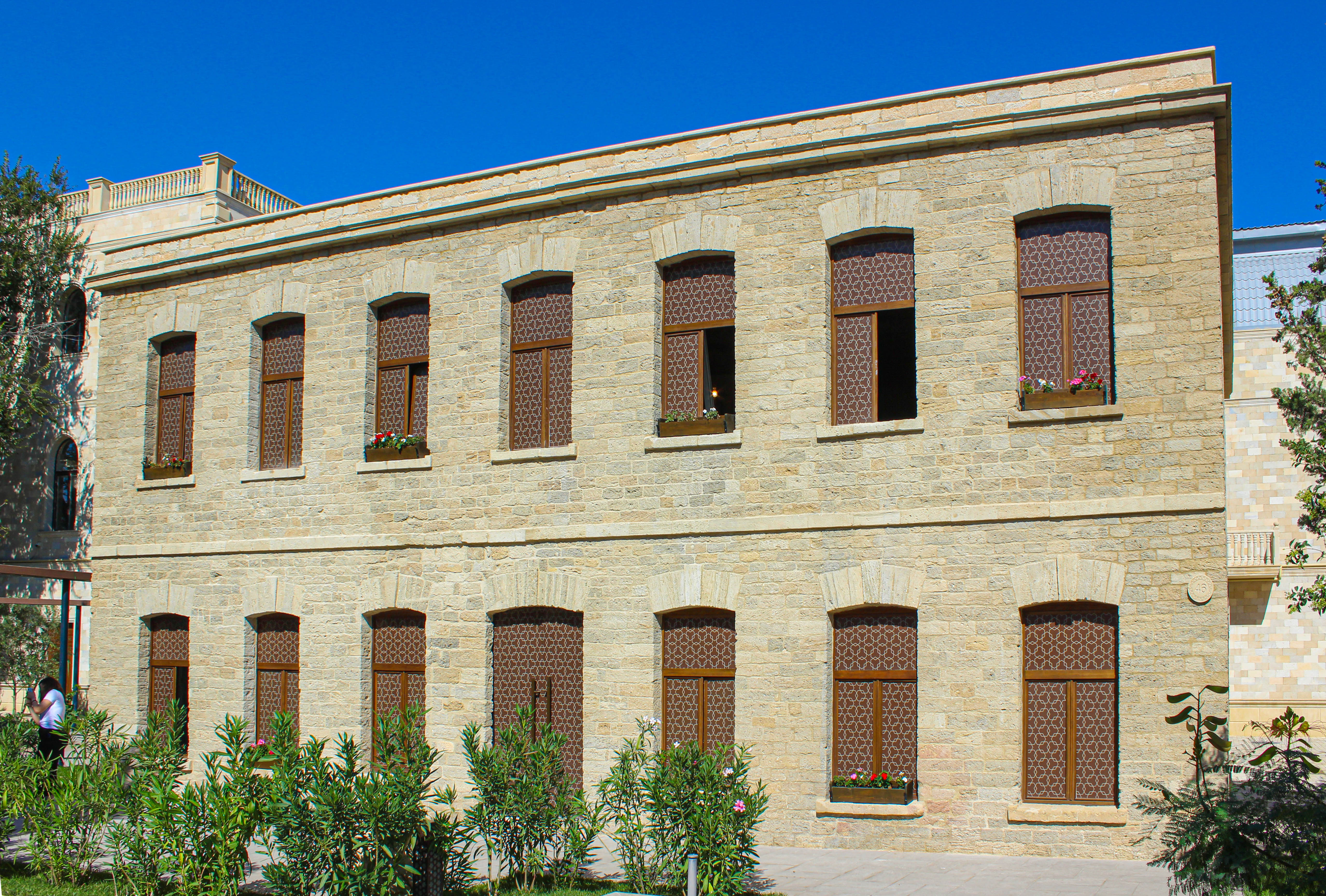

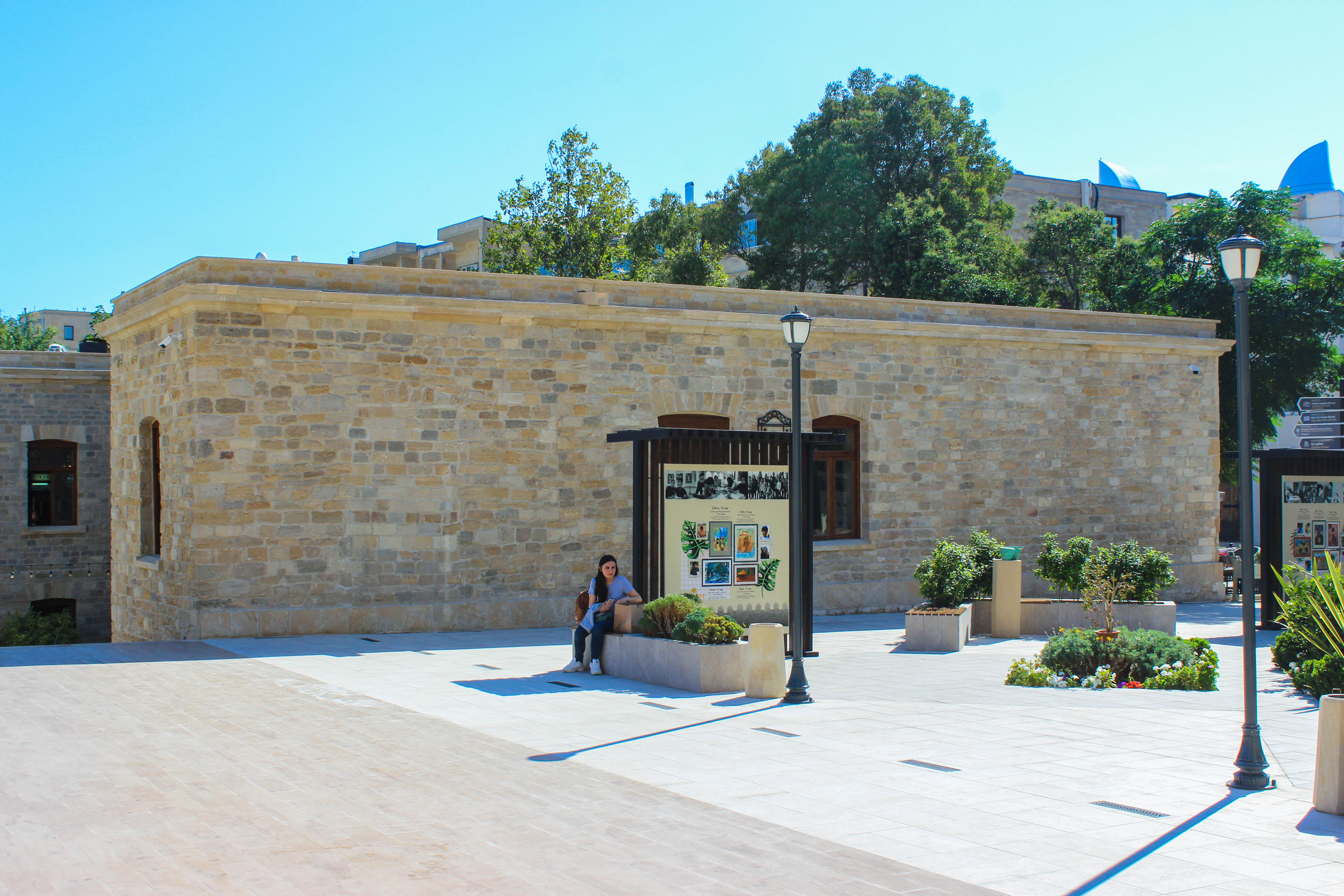

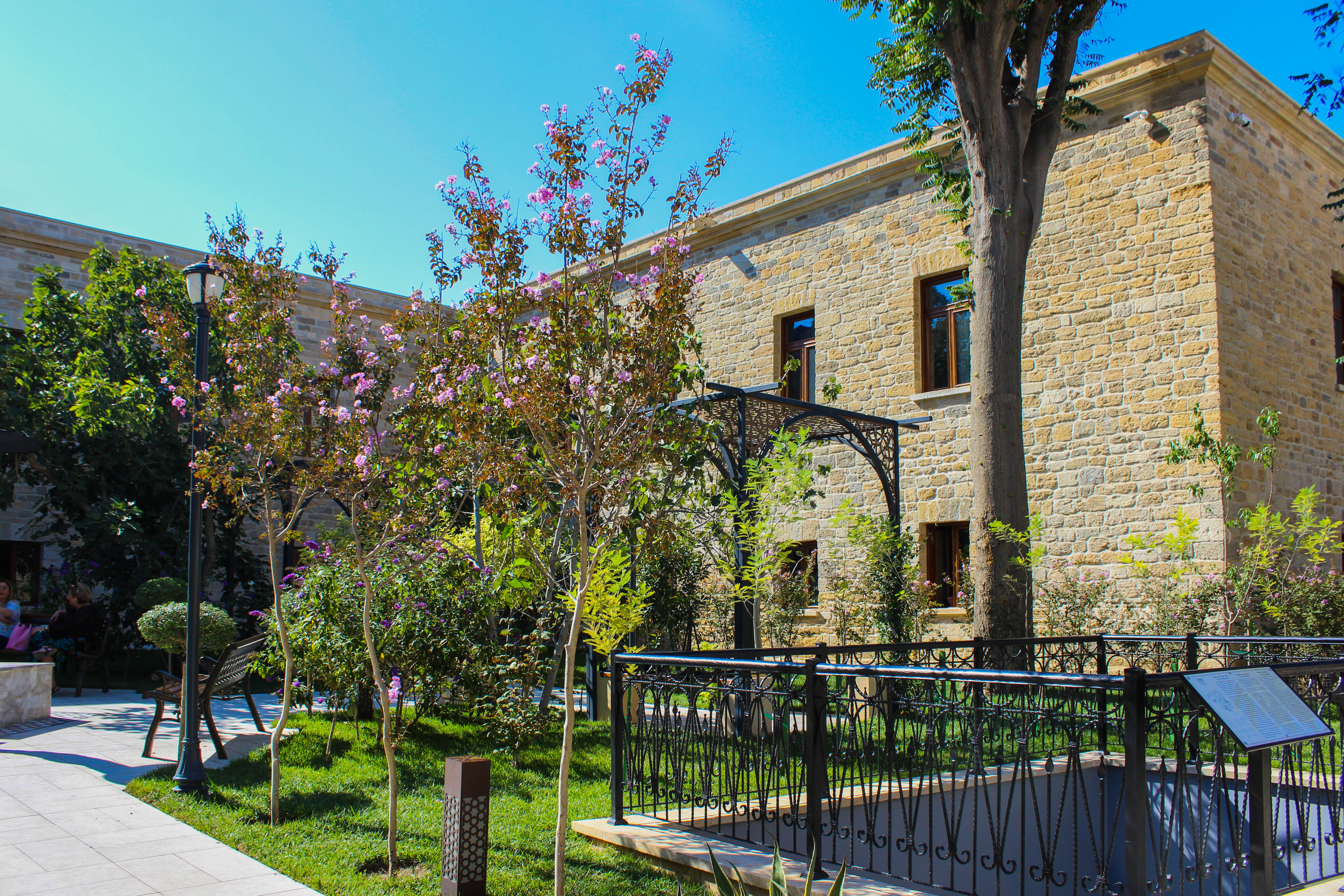

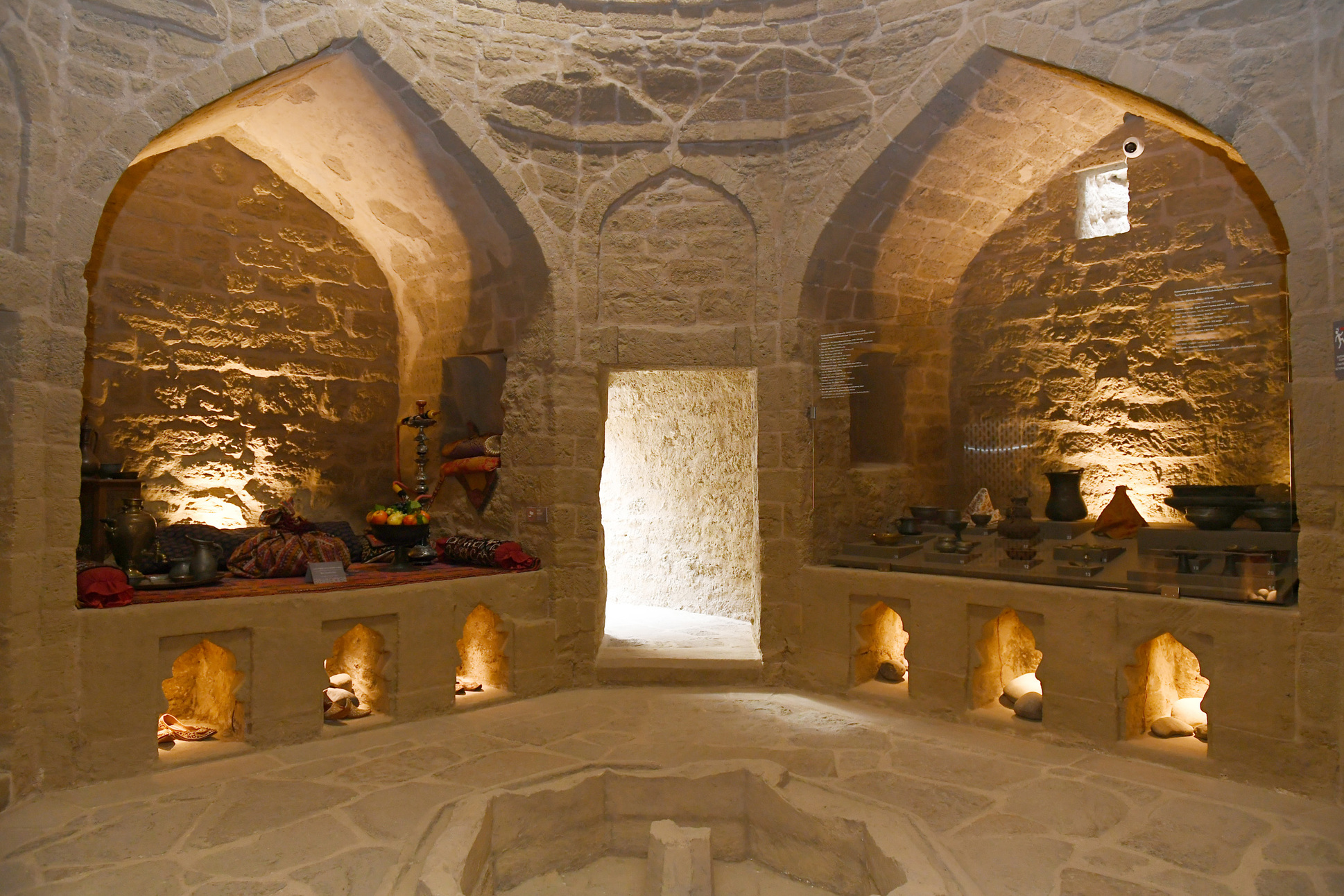
Restored Underground Bathhouse

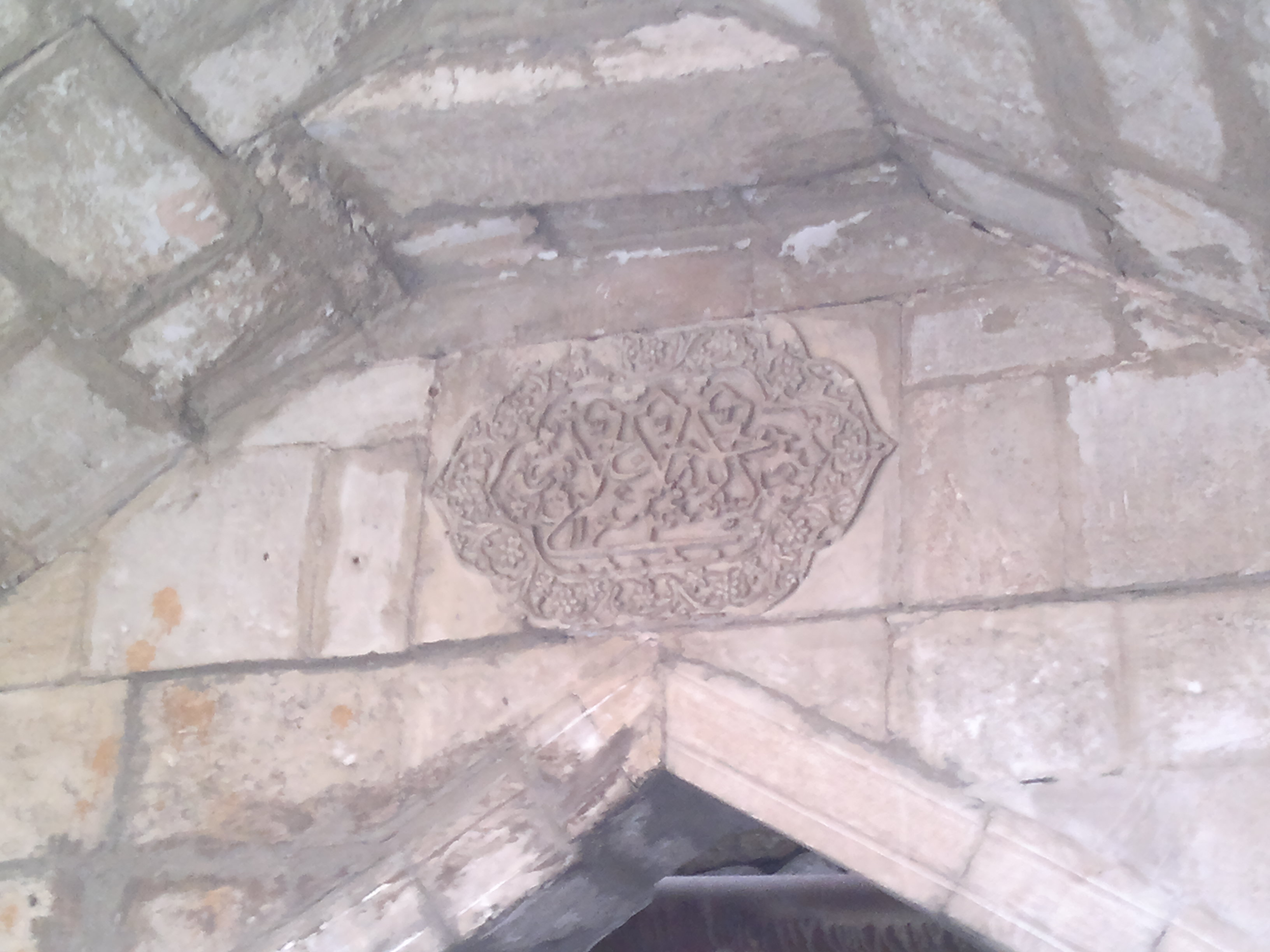
Inscription on entrance portal
