= Muhammadquli Khan =

Muhammadquli khan

Khan of Baku
- Reign: 1791–1792
- Coronation: 1791
- Predecessor: Mirza Muhammad Khan II
- Successor: Huseyngulu khan
- Born: Baku
- Died: 1792; Baku
- Burial: Karbala
- House: Bakikhanovs
- Father: Mirza Muhammad Khan I
- Religion: Shiite

Muhammadquli Khan was the fourth khan of Baku.

== Reign ==
He was a younger brother of Malik Muhammad Khan and the son of Mirza Muhammad Khan I, his birth date is not known. Since death of Fatali khan, he was trying to usurp Baku khanate using inexperience of both new Quba khan Ahmed khan and his nephew Mirza Muhammad II. He assured ambitious Ahmed khan of his loyalty if he was rewarded the khanate. Ahmed khan sent an army contingent to Baku to set up Muhammadquli agha on the throne in 1791. Since Baku army only consisted of 500 men or so Mirza Muhammad abdicated in favor of his uncle that year.

However, he did not obey Ahmed khan, didn't send tributes. Quba khan changed his allegiance to former khan and besieged Baku, Muhammadquli defeated their forces with help of city folk.

Ahmed khan died in March 1791 and was succeeded by 13-year-old brother - Shaykhali Khan. Mirza Muhammad again was given army to march on Baku. Shaykali further asked Count Ivan Gudovich to besiege Baku. Muhammadquli quickly sent his letter of submission to Russia, asking for help. Confused Gudovich ordered counter-admiral Pyotr Shishkin to resolve the problem and act in Russia's interests. However order was delayed because of unknown reasons and Baku was bombarded. Muhammadquli khan forced to make peace with Shaykhali in October and paid him 24.000 rubles as compensation.

== Death ==
Characterized by Abbasgulu Bakikhanov as "generous but harsh" person, he died in 1792 in Baku and was buried in Karbala. He was succeeded by his nephew - Huseyngulu Khan.
