= Tofig Bakikhanov =

Azerbaijani composer (1930–2026)

- Tofiq Bakıxanov
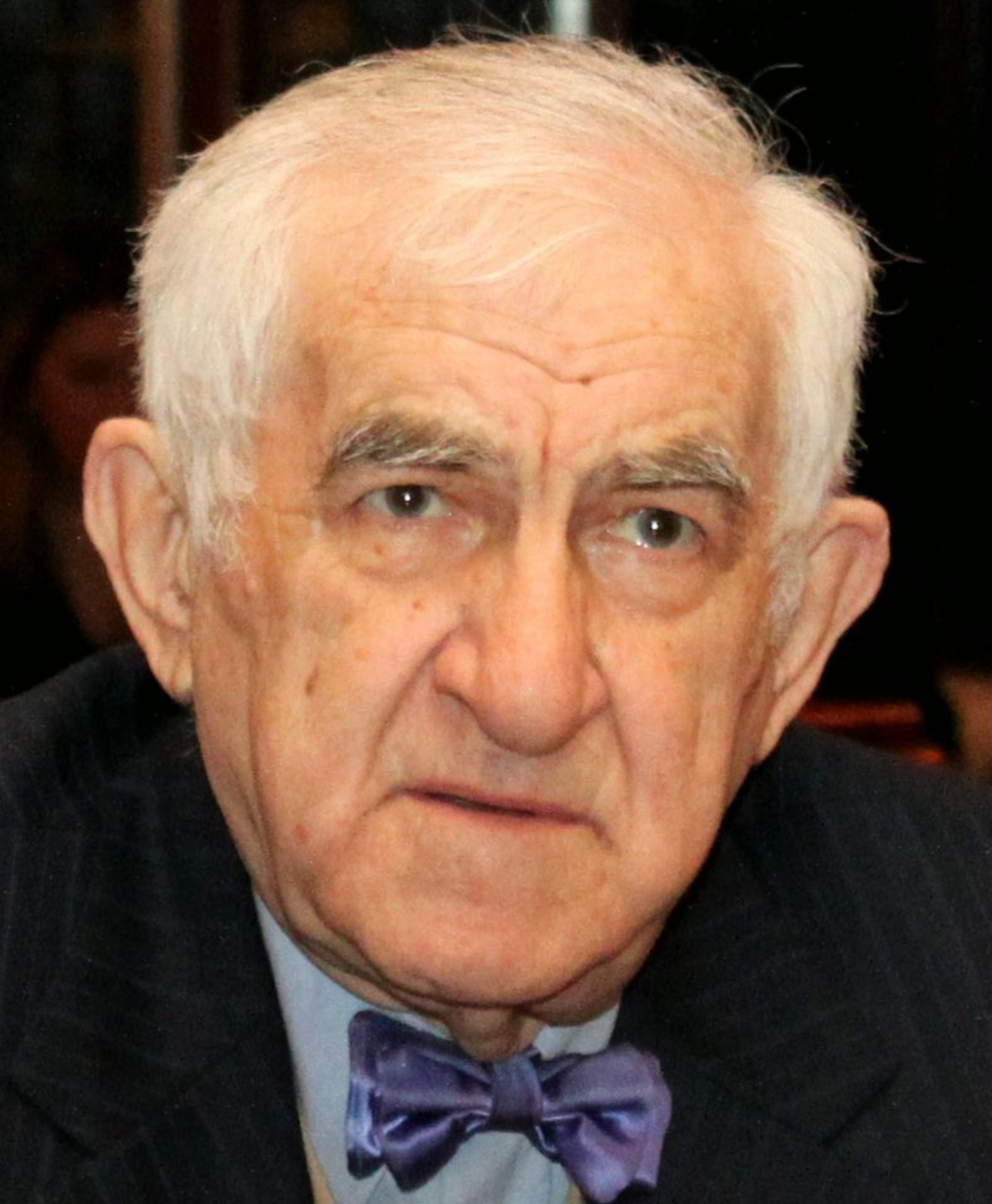
- Bakikhanov in 2010
- Born: 8 December 1930; Baku, Azerbaijan SSR, Transcaucasian SFSR, USSR
- Died: 23 August 2026 (aged 95); Baku, Azerbaijan
- Education: Azerbaijan State Conservatory
- Occupations: Composer; Academic teacher
- Organizations: Zeynally Baku College of Music; Baku Academy of Music
- Family: Bakikhanovs
- Awards: People's Artiste of the Azerbaijan SSR; Order of the Badge of Honour

Tofig Ahmed-agha oglu Bakikhanov (Azerbaijani: Tofiq Əhmədağa oğlu Bakıxanov; 8 December 1930 – 23 August 2026) was an Azerbaijani composer, violinist and academic teacher. He appeared as a violin soloist already during his studies, was the violinist of the trio of the Azerbaijan State Academic Philharmonic Hall, and played internationally from 1969.

Bakikhanov composed three ballets, three musical comedies written in collaboration, eight symphonies, five symphonic poems related to the mugham tradition of his home country, 26 concertos for different instruments, more than 20 sonatas and other chamber music, and more than 100 songs. He taught at the Zeynally Baku College of Music from 1953 and worked for the Azernashr publishing house from 1966. From 1970 he taught at the Baku Academy of Music. He was awarded the title People's Artiste of the Azerbaijan SSR in 1990.

== Life and career ==
Tofig Bakikhanov was born in Baku on 8 December 1930, in the noble family of Ahmad Bakikhanov, a tar player and music educator, also awarded People's Artiste of Azerbaijan (1973). The family claims descent from Mirza Muhammad Khan II, the third Khan of Baku. He grew up with a brother and a sister. Uzeyir Hajibeyli was a neighbor, and urged the family to send the children to study European instruments. Bakikhanov studied the violin from age ten at the music school (now the Bülbül Secondary Specialised Music School) of the U. Hajibeyli Azerbaijan State Conservatoire. In 1953, Bakikhanov graduated in violin from the Conservatory, where Alexander Amiton was his teacher. He majored in composition in 1957 after studies with Gara Garayev. During his student years, he performed as a violinist, playing at the Academy, in concert halls, and on radio. In 1947 he performed Henri Vieuxtemps's Violin Concerto No. 4 at a concert at the Azerbaijan Opera and Ballet Theatre, celebrating the 800th anniversary of the Persian poet Nizami Ganjavi. He performed as a soloist with the Azerbaijan State Symphony Orchestra and with the Azerbaijan Radio Symphony Orchestra. He became the violinist of the Azerbaijan Philharmonic Society's trio.

From 1953 Bakikhanov was teacher and also head of the string department of the Zeynally Baku College of Music. From 1966 he managed the department of arts edition and from 1968, the department of sheet music of the Azernashr publishing house. In 1968, Bakikhanov's Caspian Ballade ballet was staged at the [Azerbaijan State Academic Opera and Ballet Theater. Starting in 1969, Bakikhanov performed recitals in Paris, Moscow, Tbilisi, Istanbul, İzmir and Tehran, among others.

From 1970, Bakikhanov began to work as the senior teacher of the department of chamber music and as the dean of the performing program of the Azerbaijan Conservatory. He continued to play his works in recitals in Bulgaria, Georgia, Iran, Russia and Turkey. He was a member of the national association of composers from 1958.

Bakikhanov died in Baku on 23 August 2026, at the age of 95.

== Works ==
Bakikhanov composed three ballets, eight symphonies, five symphonic poems, and around 100 songs. He collaborated with the composer Nariman Mammadov for three musical comedies. He wrote 26 concertos for different instruments (including violin, cello, flute, oboe, and double concertos), more than 20 sonatas, and other chamber music.

In his symphonic poems, he explored the mugham tradition of his home country. He dedicated his Eighth Symphony to the memory of composer Uzeyir Hajibeyov whom he had known since childhood. His songs were performed by artists such as Ilhama Guliyeva, Flora Karimova, Zeynab Khanlarova, Rauf Adigozalov and Mobil Ahmadov.

His compositions include:

- Mammadali Is Going to Resort, musical comedy (1968)
- One of Six, musical comedy (1968)
- The Girl Is in a Hurry to a Date, musical comedy
- Welcoming Overture (1961)
- Three symphonies for chamber orchestra (1960, 1962, 1963)
- Caspian Ballade, ballet (1968)
- Eastern Poem, ballet (1976)
- Good and Evil, ballet

His books include:

- Musiqili ömrüm (My Musical Life, 2003), OCLC 55892033
- Azərbaycan və İran musiqiçilərinin qarşılıqlı əlaqələri (The Interrelationships of Azerbaijani and Iranian Musicians, 2006)

== Awards ==
Bakikhanov's honours and awards include:

- 1973 Honorary Art Worker of Azerbaijan
- 1990 People's Artiste of the Azerbaijan SSR
- 1994–2000 Abbasgulu agha Bakikhanov prize
- 2000 Order of the Badge of Honour
- 2010 Honorary diploma of the President of Azerbaijan Republic
- 2021 Sharaf Order
- 2025 Labor Order
