= Abdulla agha Bakikhanov =

General of the Imperial Russian Army

- Abdulla ağa Bakıxanov
- Born: June 21, 1824; Tiflis
- Died: July 20, 1879 (aged 55); Tiflis
- Occupation: Military
- Father: Mirza Muhammad Khan II
- Family: Bakikhanovs

Abdulla agha Bakikhanov (Note: "Bakikhanov" derives from "Baku-Khanov". A Russified name.) (Azerbaijani: Abdulla ağa Bakıxanov) was an Azerbaijani major general in the Imperial Russian Army, and the half-brother of the Azerbaijani writer and educator Abbasgulu Bakikhanov.

== Life ==
Abdulla agha was born in 1824 to Mirza Muhammad Khan II of Baku and his second wife Kheyr-un Nisa Khanum. He was in the cavalry division of the Caucasian army and became an officer in 1843. In 1859 he was promoted to colonel, and on January 1, 1871 to major general. He participated in campaigns in the Caucasian War and Russo-Turkish War (1877–1878). In the 1850s-1870s he lived in the city of Quba in his hereditary possessions and was a large landowners in the Quba district. He helped Hasan bey Zardabi distribute the newspaper Akinchi, the first newspaper in the Azerbaijani language.

Bakikhanov was in the Caucasian army until May 1876. On July 20, 1879 he died in Tiflis.

== Awards ==
- 3rd Class Order of Saint Anne.
- 2nd Class Order of Saint Stanislaus with swords for muslims set.
- 2nd Class Order of Saint Anne.
- 4th Class Order of Saint Vladimir with swords for muslims set.

== See also ==
- Bakikhanovs

== Sources ==
- Список генералам по старшинству. Saint Petersburg: Ministry of War of the Russian Empire. 1871.
