= Hasan Bakikhanov =

Imperial Russian general and Azerbaijani noble

Hasan agha Bakikhanov
- Həsən ağa Bakıxanov
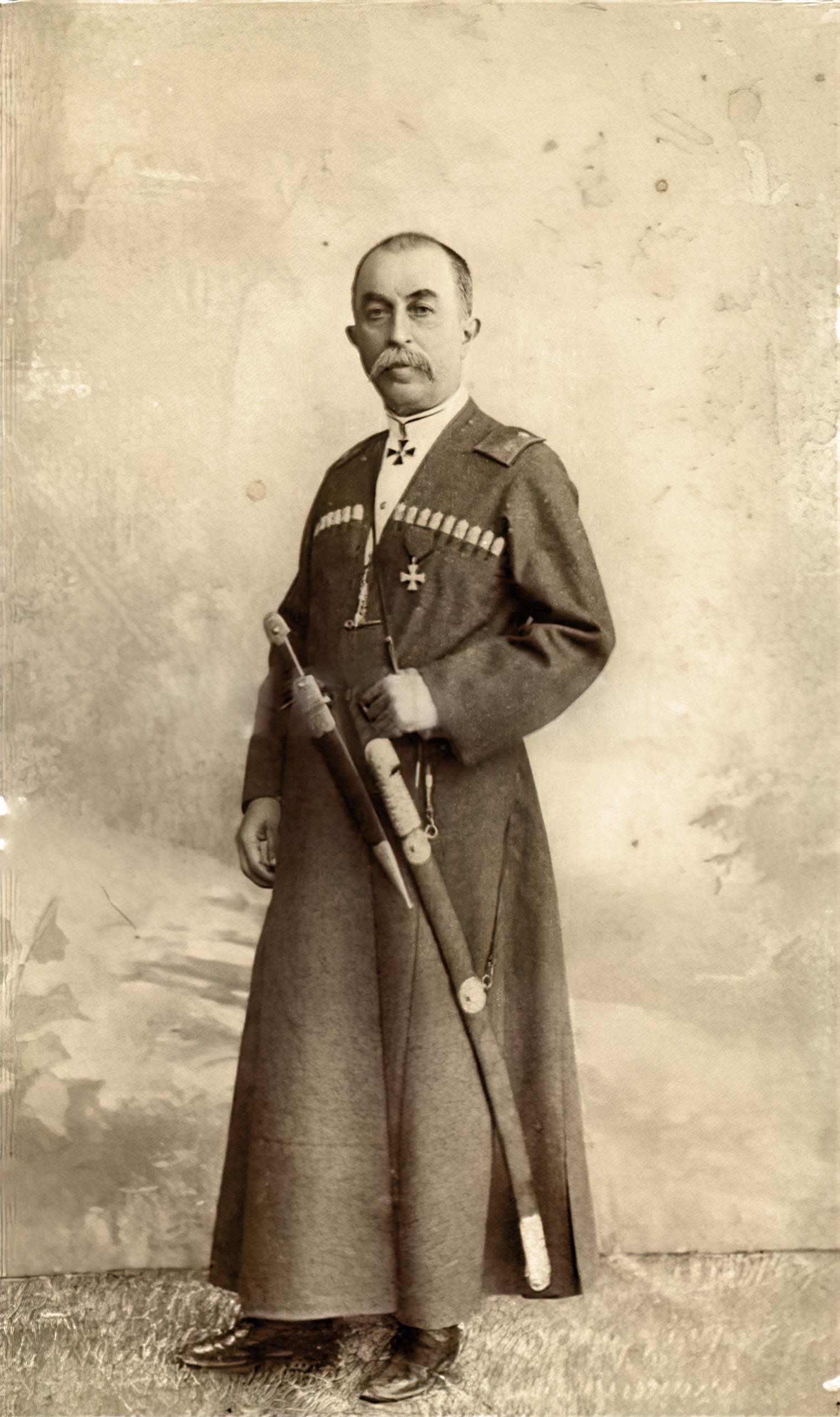
- Born: 8 May 1833; Quba
- Died: 10 December 1898 (aged 65); Baku
- Burial place: 12 December 1898; Bibi-Heybat Mosque
- Relatives: Mirza Muhammad Khan II (grandfather); Jafargulu Bakikhanov (father); Abbasgulu Bakikhanov (uncle)
- Military career
- Allegiance: Russian Empire
- Branch: Imperial Russian Army
- Service years: 1847 - 1880
- Rank: Major general
- Unit: Special Caucasian Corps

Hasan agha Bakikhanov (Azerbaijani: Həsən ağa Bakıxanov) — was an Imperial Russian general and Azerbaijani noble.

== Life ==
He was born on 8 May 1833 to Jafargulu Bakikhanov and Chimnaz khanym in Quba. Enrolling at age of 14 in Tbilisi Corps of Cadets, he wanted to pursue military career just like his father. He sometime later moved on to study at Page Corps. After study, despite his origin, served in the ranks of the cavalry detachments of the mountain police as an ordinary, and then as a non-commissioned officer.

In 1854, he received the Mark of the Distinction a military order, which was the highest award for soldiers and non-commissioned officers for combat services and for courage against the enemy. On 8 (20) September 1859 he was transferred and stationed under provision of his father, serving in Special Caucasian Corps with his younger brother Ahmad Bakikhanov. He participated in many campaigns and was a decorated soldier. He served in Russian embassy in Qajar Iran sometime. He retired in 1880 after being promoted to major general.

He was accused of being tyrant and blackmailing his rivals. In one case, he got one critical subject from Əmirxanlı - Agha beg Bedirkhanbekov imprisoned in Baku and accused him of being sympathetic to Muridism, despite that Agha beg was a shiite.

== Awards ==
- Order of St. Vladimir of the 3rd class
- Order of St. Anne of the 4th class with the inscription "For Bravery" (1861)
- Order of St. Stanislaus - 2nd and 3rd class
- Mark of distinction of the Military Order (1854)
- Medal "In memory of the war of 1853-1856" on the St. George's ribbon
- A bronze medal commemorating the centenary of the Order of St. George
- Light bronze medal "In memory of the Russo-Turkish war of 1877-1878"
- Cross "For Service in the Caucasus"
- Order of the Lion and the Sun (for the service for some time in the Russian embassy in Qajar Iran)

== Death ==
He died on 10 December 1898, 9 p.m. after a long illness. He was buried on 12 December 1898 in a military ceremony with attendance of city folk, Salyan military regiment, Muslim clerics and mayor Nikolaus von der Nonne.

== Family ==
He was married two times - firstly to his cousin, Zibün Nisa Begüm, daughter of Abbasgulu Bakikhanov in 1856, secondly to Ummu Salama, daughter of Haji Qadir agha in 1869. He had two daughters, both from Ummu Salama:

- Fatma khanum (b. 1870, died c.1890s)
- Reyhan khanum (married to Adil khan Ziyadkhanov)

== Ancestry ==
Ancestors of Hasan Bakikhanov

8. Malik Muhammad Khan
4. Mirza Muhammad Khan II
9. Khadija Bika
2. Jafargulu Bakikhanov
10. Bahram beg
5. Sofia
11. ?
1. Hasan agha Bakikhanov
12. Hajji Sherif
6. Khanbutay beg Yargunvi (1761-1823)
13. ?
3. Chimnaz khanum
14. ?
7. Tavat khanum
15. ?
