= Hosein Qoli Khan Badkubeh =

Khan of Baku (1774–1845)

Khan of Baku
- Reign: 1792 – 3 October 1806
- Predecessor: Muhammadquli Khan
- Successor: Annexation of Baku khanate to Russian Empire
- Born: 1774; Baku
- Died: 1845 (aged 70–71); Ardabil
- Burial: Karbala
- Religion: Shia Islam

Hosein Qoli Khan Badkubeh (Persian: حسین قلی خان بادکوبه) was the last khan of the Baku Khanate, ruling from 1791 to 1806. During the Russo-Iranian War of 1804–1813, he supported Iran. He was ultimately forced to flee to Iran due to a rebellion by the inhabitants of Baku, who did not want to endure another Russian siege. His family adopted the name of Badkubeh after relocating to the city of Arak, whereas a different segment of the family that stayed and worked with the Russians adopted the name Bakikhanov.

== Life ==
Hosein Qoli Khan was born in 1774 to Aligulu agha (brother of Malik Muhammad and Muhammadquli Khan). After the death of the khan in 1792, begs headed by Qasim beg Selimkhanov (according to other sources, his surname was Mansurov) declared him as their new khan.

== Early reign ==
His reign was contested by his cousin, former khan Mirza Muhammad II. Soon after his ascension, he defeated Mirza Muhammad, who fled to Quba. He also sent Manaf Beg Selimkhanov to Count Gudovich, to present his application for Russian citizenship in 1792. However, he was detained in Derbent by Shaykh Ali Khan's men, who regarded himself as overlord of Baku until 1795.

Shaykhali Khan marched on Baku in 1794. However, upon hearing the news from the Shaki Khanate that Salim Khan, the new khan of Shaki, had massacred all of the children of the former khan, including Shaykhali's nephew, he instead marched on Shaki, leaving Mirza Muhammad II near Balakhana with a thousand men. Being not far from Baku, Mirza Muhammad blocked all trade and support routes to city, causing Hosein Qoli Khan to send Manaf beg to Gudovich again complaining of Shaykhali khan while he himself suddenly ambushing Mirza Muhammad and capturing him with his family. His younger brother Husein agha was the only one to escape battle, go to Quba and tell the story. Gudovich on the other hand, advised Shaykhali to settle matters peacefully. Indeed, through Mostafa khan's help, cousins made peace and Mirza Muhammad went back to Quba, while retaining his income from Baku oil fields. According to treaty signed in December 1795:

1. The khan and his successors should be approved in their ranks by Her Imperial Majesty.

2. The khan can not enjoy diplomatic relations with neighboring states who are not subjects of Russia, without preliminary agreement with the main commander of the Caucasus front.

3. Russian merchants to be given the most advantageous benefits.

4. In case of crash of vessels, goods should be returned to their owners in due time.

5. At least one Russian ship has to be anchored in Baku port always.

6. Merchant affairs among Russians and Persians and others is not to be matter of the Baku elders, but of the consul.

7. Paying tribute to Shaykhali khan is not incompatible with Russian citizenship

— Materials for the new history of the Caucasus, from 1722 to 1893 [Text] / P.G.Butkov. – St.Petersburg: Printing house of the Imperial Academy of Sciences, 1869. Part 2. p. 293 (in Russian)

== Capture of Baku ==
After Agha Muhammad Shah's invasion of Georgia, Shaykhali Khan rushed to submit to Qajar rule. This did not go without retribution from Russia as Catherine II ordered Valerian Zubov to invade Shirvan. Zubov stormed Derbent on 10 May and captured Shaykhali, moving on to Baku. However Hosein Qoli Khan sent envoys to Zubov on 20 May, explaining his will to submit. Khan himself arrived at Russian encampment near Gilgilçay on 13 June with city keys. General Vasili Rakhmanov was sent to occupy Baku with 3 battalions of infantry, 2 cavalry squadrons and 3 artillery guns. Tsitsianov was named commanding officer of castle in 1797. However, death of Catherine II and Paul's cancellation of expedition, forced Zubov to withdraw to Russia in 1797.

== Later reign ==
Now being left at mercy of Agha Muhammad, Hosein Qoli Khan was captured and imprisoned in Shusha on 11 May. However shah was assassinated next day, Hosein Qoli Khan left for Baku. Hearing developments, Mirza Muhammad rushed to seize Baku. Hosein Qoli Khan's fast arrival ruined his plans. After new treaty, he positioned himself in Mashtaga, acting as a vice-khan. However, he later sent gifts to Fatali shah, fearing another invasion.

Russian consul in Qajar Iran - Skibinevski arrived in Baku on 22 January 1800 and demanded compensation for Russian merchants from whom large sums of money was taken after Russian withdrawal. The khan declined, but pleaded guilty when a Russian ship "Kizlyar" fired a cannon on city on 6 February. He sent envoys to congratulate Alexander I on his ascension on 1 March 1801.

He invaded Mashtaga, this time with Mostafa Khan's help in 1803. He then exiled Mirza Muhammad II to Quba.

== Occupation of Baku ==
Baku was again a matter of interest to Russians during the Russo-Persian War of 1804–13. As a result of Tsitsianov's negotiations in early 1803, an agreement was reached with the ambassador of the khan of Baku, Allahverdi Beg, on conceding Baku to Russia. On 24 April 1803, Tsitsianov asked Vorontsov to dispatch two regiments (from Taman and the Crimea) at his disposal for the garrison in Baku and the occupation of other points lying about. However, in 1804, at the insistence of the Baku and Shemakhan nobility, the agreement with Russia was cancelled by Hosein Qoli Khan. Soon tensions rose in Baku, as city folk killed 7 of the Russian consul's soldiers, expelling him out of the city.

In 1805, a Russian squadron entered the Baku bay under the command of General Irinarch Zavalishin and proceeded to siege the city. Khan sent an envoy to Zavalishin to negotiate, however, he responded that he had been sent by the emperor to occupy Baku and demanded the immediate surrender of the city. Khan asked for a time to give an answer. On 15 April, when the deadline passed and the city did not surrender, Zavalishin landed ashore. However, with reinforcements from Shaykhali khan and Nuh beg of Derbent, khan prevailed in defence of the city. Having suffered defeat after several battles, the Russians boarded the ships and retreated to the island of Sari (near Lankaran).

On 27 December 1805, Tsitsianov informed Alexander I that he himself was going with the army to Baku, to help Zavalishin. At the beginning of February 1806, Tsitsianov, marching with a large army, joined forces with General Zavalishin 2 versts from Baku and began negotiations with khan about the surrender of the fortress to the Russians. Russian troops encamped near Nakhirbulag, just next to city walls. On 8 February, khan, accompanied by his retinue, left the fortress to present city keys to Prince Tsitsianov. In a surprise to many, khan's cousin Ibrahim beg suddenly gunned Tsitsianov and killed him.

Hosein Qoli Khan went to Ağsu in person to submit Abbas Mirza. Meanwhile, Mirza Muhammad Khan II joined army of Russian general Sergei Bulgakov in July 1806 to guide Russian army to Baku. Together they captured Baku on 6 October 1806, while Hosein Qoli Khan fled to Ardabil with his family. Hosein Qoli Khan appeared again in 1826, this time with Qajar army to recapture Baku, but failed to do so. He died in Ardabil, 1845 and was buried in Karbala.

== Family ==
He had 8 wives, 5 sons and 17 daughters.

=== Wives ===
1. Zainat khanum
2. Fatma sultan (b. 1776, m. 1801, d. 1804) – daughter of Malik Muhammad Khan
3. Fatma khanum
4. Hajet khanum
5. Begistan khanum
6. Khushendam khanum
7. Zeynisharaf khanum
8. Gulistan khanum

=== Sons ===
1. Lutfali khan – had issues
2. Isgandar khan – had issues
3. Nuh khan – had issues
4. Salman khan – had issues
5. Musa khan (son of Gulistan khanum) – had issues

=== Daughters ===
1. Fatma Sultanat bika
2. Aynur khanum
3. Badr Jahan khanum
4. Sahib Sultan bika
5. Khurshid khanum
6. Ummu Salama khanum
7. Saadet begim
8. Zainat begim
9. Sharif khanum
10. Aisha begim khanum
11. Chimnaz khanum – married to Kazim beg Selimkhanov (1814–1874)
12. Tila begim khanum
13. Rukhsara begim khanum
14. A daughter who was married to Mahammad agha Bakikhanov
15. A daughter who was married to Abdullah khan Rudbari
16. A daughter who was married to Aghamir Karimov
17. A daughter who was married to Zulfugar agha (a cousin of Hosein Qoli Khan)
18. A daughter who was married to Mahammad agha (a cousin of Hosein Qoli Khan)

== Sources ==
- Behrooz, Maziar (2023). Iran at War: Interactions with the Modern World and the Struggle with Imperial Russia. I.B. Tauris. ISBN 978-0755637379.
- Bournoutian, George (2021). From the Kur to the Aras: A Military History of Russia's Move into the South Caucasus and the First Russo-Iranian War, 1801–1813. Brill. ISBN 978-9004445154.
