= Mirza Muhammad Khan I =

Mirza Muhammad khan I

Khan of Baku
- Reign: 1747 – 1768
- Coronation: 1747
- Predecessor: Galem of Gilan (as governor for Afsharids)
- Successor: Malik Muhammad Khan
- Born: c. 1727; Baku
- Died: 17 October 1768 (aged 40–41); Baku
- Burial: Karbala
- Father: Dargah Qoli Beg
- Religion: Shia Islam

Mirza Muhammad Khan I was the founding Khan of the Baku Khanate. He was a descendant of the Iranian garrison commander of Baku of 1723.

== Background ==
Mirza Muhammad Khan belonged to a family which was originally from Mazandaran. He was the son of Dargah Qoli Beg, who was the governor of Baku in the first quarter of the 18th century.

== Life ==
He was born in 1727, in Baku. His father ruled at least till 1731. However, he was charged with treason and relieved of duty in an unknown year. He rejoined Nadir Shah and was killed in 1738 in a battle. After Treaty of Ganja, Nadir Shah appointed a certain Galem from Gilan as a sultan of Baku, also awarded Ashur khan Afshar with lands in Absheron peninsula, including Sabunchu, Keshla and Zabrat. His grandson, son of Malik Muhammad Khan, is named after him. He also acknowledged his grandson Mirza Muhammad as khan at the age of 11.

== Reign ==
Taking advantage of Nadir's fall, he seized the city and killed the sultan, appointing former naib Selim khan's grand Muhammed Selim bek as the new sultan in 1747. His first action was to rebuild the navy, as he was also a former admiral of Nadir Shah and chief of shipyard of Langarud.

Situations changed in 1749, when new Afshar shah Ebrahim Afshar demanded reinforcements from Northern Caucasian khanates. Out of all khans, only Hajji Muhammad Ali Khan of Shirvan submitted to new Persian shah. Khanates of Karabakh, Shaki, Baku, Salyan and Sultanate of Gabala trying to keep their independence, invaded Shamakhi in alliance, forcing Hajji Muhammad to swear that he won't submit to Afsharids. Hajji Muhammad soon was deposed and replaced by a yuzbashi appointed by Haji Chalabi. Another player in regional politics was adventurer Ahmed khan Shahsevan, a chief of Shahsevan tribe. He urged khans to end Haji Chalabi's supremacy. Mirza Mahammad sided with Ahmed khan; however, the battle was a disaster and Mirza Muhammad barely escaped with his life.

In order to escape newly crowned Shahrukh Afshar's invasion, he sent his ambassador Haji Fehim to Astrakhan, to ask for Russian protection. He later allied to khan of Quba Huseynali khan in 1758.

In 1756, he engaged his son to the daughter of Ahmed Khan of Shahsevan. However, the Salyan khan Ibrahim khan Rudbar seized her before marriage, taking advantage of the death of Ahmed Khan. Mirza Muhammad Khan decided to fight with the Salyan khan and even made two bridges to cross Kura. We do not have information about the results of this campaign, apparently it did not take place, since in 1757 the crown prince of Guba, Fatali and his army attacked the Salyan khanate, expelled Ibrahim Khan and annexed Salyan to Guba.

Next year, another threat from Persia - Muhammad Hasan khan landed in what is today Azerbaijan. Mirza Muhammad unsuccessfully tried to establish with Shahverdi khan against him at first, but seeing the odds, sent his Haji Abdul Ali with tributes to Muhammad Hasan. As a further precaution, he employed a naval company under the leadership of John Elton, now having 3 warships and 3 merchant ships at his disposal.

He soon acknowledged suzerainty of Fatali khan of Guba and started to join his military campaigns, such as capturing of Muji castle. He cemented this alliance by marrying his son to Fatali khan's sister, after when he was practically absent from politics. He died on 17 October 1768. His body was taken and buried in Karbala.

== Family ==
He had a younger brother called Hadi beg who was ruling Mardakan and Shagan. He was survived by four sons:

1. Malik Muhammad Khan (r. 1768-1784)
  1. Mirza Muhammad Khan II (r. 1784-1791)
2. Muhammadquli Khan (r. 1791-1792)
3. Haji Aliquli agha
  1. Huseyngulu khan (r. 1792-1806)
  2. Mehdigulu agha
4. Haji Abdulhuseyn agha

== Sources ==
- Bournoutian, George (2021). From the Kur to the Aras: A Military History of Russia's Move into the South Caucasus and the First Russo-Iranian War, 1801–1813. Brill. ISBN 978-9004445154.
- Bloom, Jonathan; Blair, Sheila, eds. (2009). "Mardakan". Grove Encyclopedia of Islamic Art & Architecture. Oxford University Press. ISBN 9780195309911.
- Zonn, Igor S.; Kosarev, Aleksey N; Glantz, Michael H.; et al., eds. (2010). "Baku Khanate". The Caspian Sea Encyclopedia. Springer Science & Business Media. ISBN 978-3642115240.
- Ashurbeyli, Sara (1992) History of Baku:Medieval Ages, Baku ISBN 9789952421675
