= Ismail Khan Ziyadkhanov =

Azerbaijani politician

- İsmayıl xan Ziyadxanov
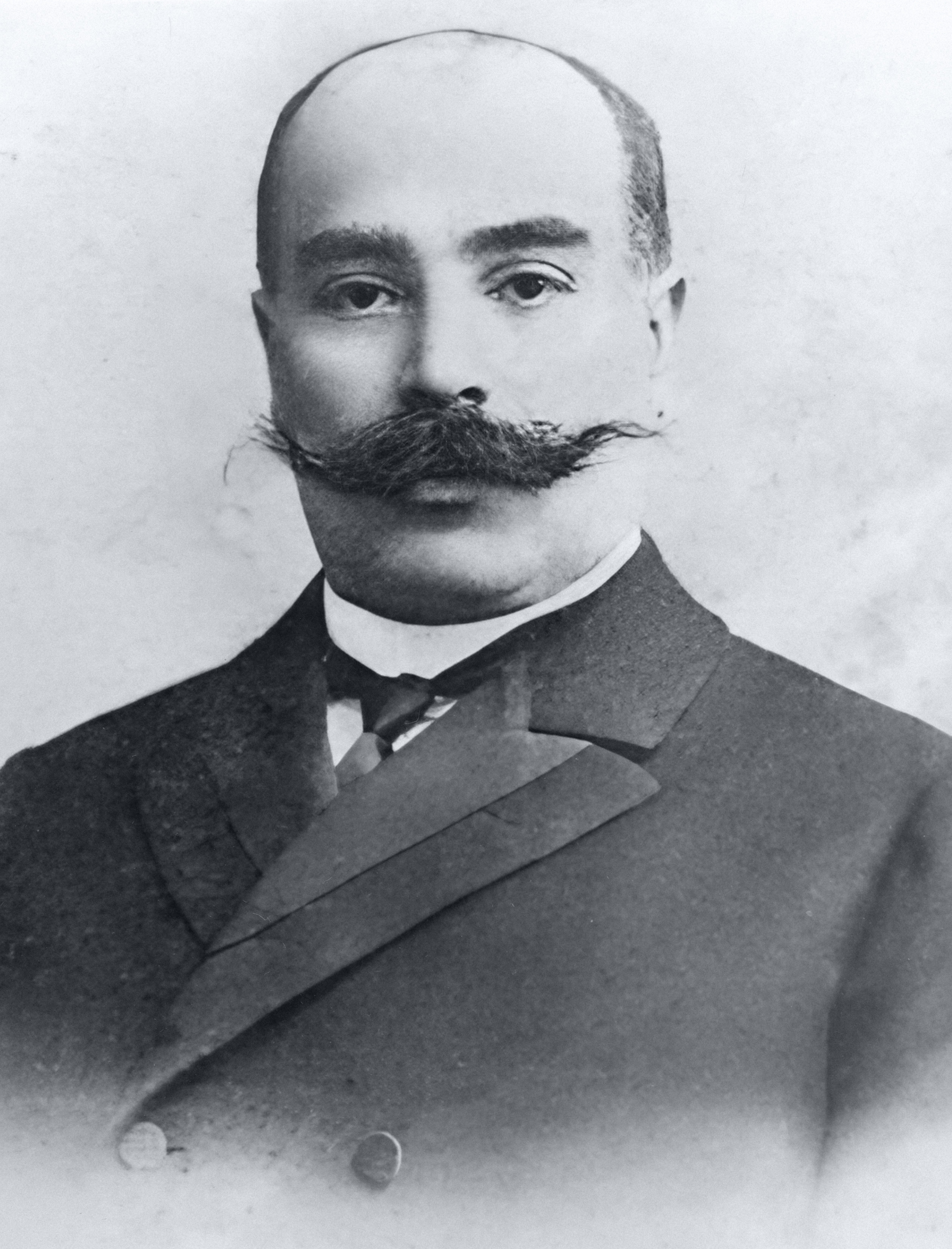
- In office 6 November 1918 – 26 December 1918
- Incumbent
- Assumed office 26 December 1918

Ismail Khan Ziyadkhanov or Ismail Khan Ziyadkhanly (August 15, 1867, Yelizavetpol, Tiflis Governorate – 1920, Ganja) was a member of the government of the Azerbaijan Democratic Republic, a diplomat, and a lieutenant colonel in the army of the Azerbaijan Democratic Republic. He was one of the five Azerbaijanis elected to the First State Duma of the Russian Empire.

Ismail Khan Ziyadkhanov was one of the founders of the Turkic Federalist Party and the "Defense" organization. During the March genocide, he fought against Dashnak forces in the Shamakhi and Goychay districts. He participated in the Karabakh movement that began in September 1918. After the April occupation, he was executed by the Bolsheviks without a trial.

Ismail Khan was a descendant of Javad Khan, the Khan of Ganja, and a grandson of Abbas Mirza, the heir to the Qajar throne. He was the brother of Shahverdi Khan Ziyadkhanov, an officer in both the Tsarist and Azerbaijan Democratic Republic armies, and Adil Khan Ziyadkhanov, who served as Deputy Foreign Minister and Ambassador to Iran for the Azerbaijan Democratic Republic.

== Life ==
=== During Tsarist Russia ===
Ismayil Khan Ziyadkhanov was born on August 15, 1867, in the city of Ganja. He received his initial education at the Ganja Male Gymnasium and later entered the Law Faculty of Moscow Imperial University. After graduating from university, he began working as an assistant prosecutor at the Tiflis District Court. In 1904, he became a member of the Ganja Muslim Charity Society.

In 1906, Ismayil Khan was elected to the First State Duma of the Russian Empire from the Yelizavetpol Governorate. He was one of the five Azerbaijani deputies elected to the Duma. In the Duma, he served as a member of the bureau of the Muslim faction and was a member of the "People's Freedom" party. During his time in the Duma, he sharply criticized the Tsarist policies of resettlement in the outskirts, the ethnic massacres in the Caucasus, and Russia's treatment of Azerbaijanis. Ismayil Khan also spoke out against injustices not only in the Caucasus but also in the Baltic regions. For signing the Vyborg Manifesto, which was a protest by the deputies against the dissolution of the Duma, Ismayil Khan was deprived of his right to be elected to the Duma and was sentenced to three months of imprisonment. He served his three-month sentence in the Sheki prison.

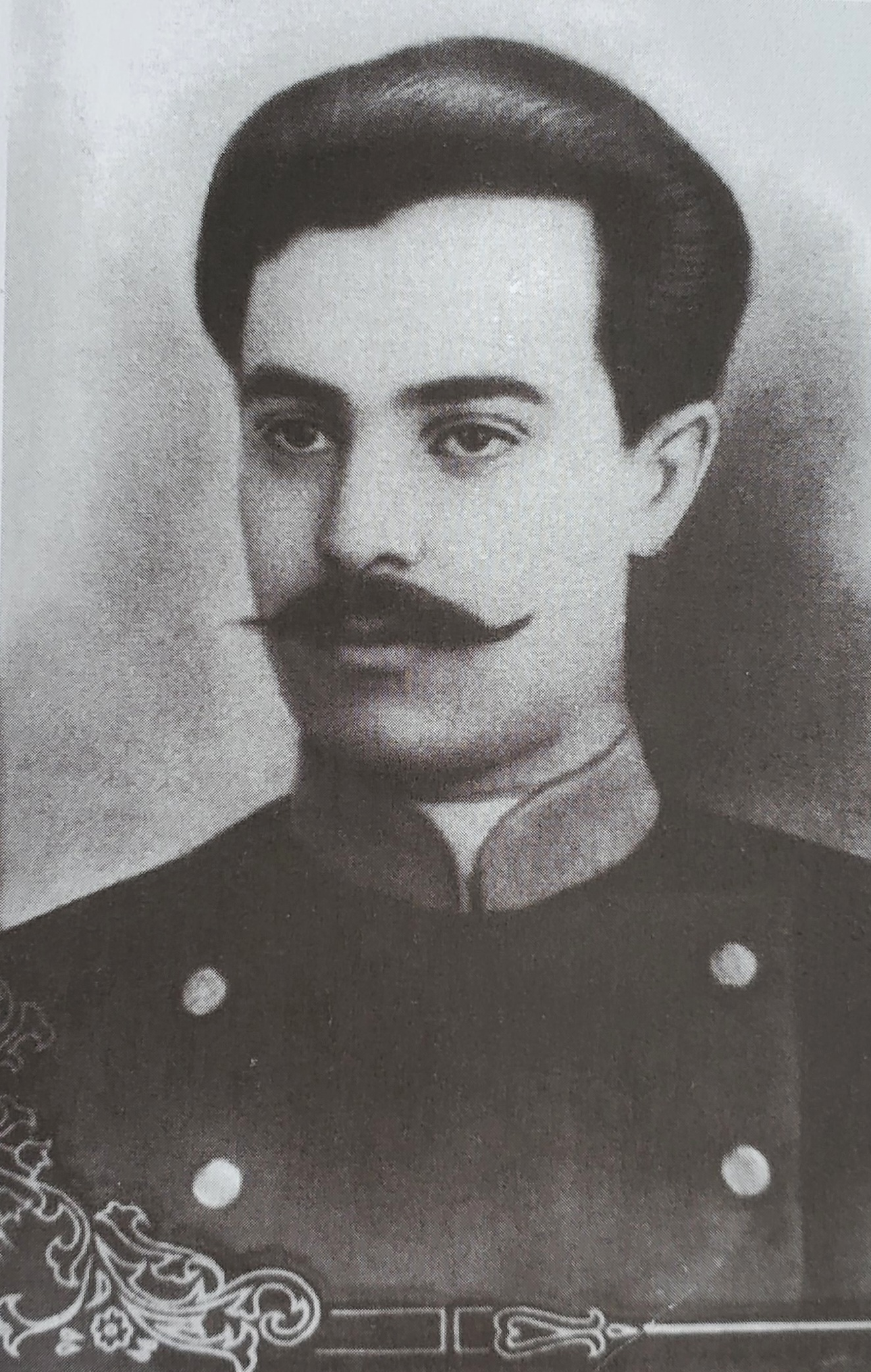
Ismayil Khan Ziyadkhanov during his student years at the end of the 19th century

In March 1907, at the congress of representatives of Muslims from the Caucasus and Crimea held in Ganja, it was decided to establish the Transcaucasian General Muslim Union under the leadership of Ismayil Khan Ziyadkhanov. In May 1907, the "Defense" organization was founded under his leadership, with the purpose of spreading education and culture among Muslims, protecting legal rights, and punishing those who trample on justice and conscience.

During World War I, the Russian command decided to recruit soldiers from Azerbaijan to increase the weakened Russian army's numbers and deploy them against Turkey. To oppose this decision, a delegation consisting of Khalil bey Khasmammadov, Ismayil Khan Ziyadkhanov, and Alekper bey Rafibeyli held negotiations with the Caucasus governor-general in Tiflis. As a result, it was decided that Azerbaijanis would be enlisted in the army on a voluntary basis rather than by compulsion.

After the Russian February Revolution in 1917, Ismayil Khan Ziyadkhanov organized the executive committee of public organizations in Ganja and was appointed the head of the city's militia. During this period, the law and order in Ganja were maintained by the militia units under his leadership. He was also one of the founders of the "Turkic Federalist Party" established in 1917.

On March 18, 1918, under the leadership of Stepan Lalayev, the Dashnaks besieged and attacked Shamakhi. They killed thousands of civilians, burned houses, and destroyed historical monuments. Lalayev's soldiers killed children and the elderly, raped women, and threw them from balconies. They killed women and children hiding in mosques by setting the mosques on fire. To help the people in the region, on March 28, 1918, Ismayil Khan Ziyadkhanov arrived in Shamakhi with a 500-strong cavalry unit he had gathered in Ganja and cleared the city of Molokan and Armenian fighters. The Armenian units fled to the village of Madrasa. Ismayil Khan pursued them to the village and then besieged it. After the battle around the village, the Armenian units left Madrasa and fled to the Molokan-inhabited village of Gozluchay.

=== During the Republic of Azerbaijan ===
On May 28, 1918, General Khosrov Bey Sultanov was appointed as the Minister of Defense in the first cabinet established in the Azerbaijan Democratic Republic. Khosrov Bey held this position until June 11. From October 6 to December 26 of the same year, military affairs were entrusted to Ismayil Khan Ziyadkhanov. He held the rank of lieutenant colonel in the Azerbaijani army. In the second government of the Azerbaijan Democratic Republic, he was appointed Commissioner for Military Affairs and later the First Deputy Minister of Foreign Affairs.

After Baku was liberated from occupation on September 15, 1918, the Karabakh movement began on September 23, 1918. The forces participating in the Karabakh movement included the 9th and 106th Turkish regiments, national volunteer units, and the 1st Azerbaijani division. On October 4, the Caucasian Islamic Army launched an offensive from Aghdam towards Shusha and fully cleared Shusha of Armenian-Dashnak forces by October 8, 1918. Ismayil Khan Ziyadkhanov, the government's commissioner, also participated in these battles.

On March 25, 1919, Ismayil Khan Ziyadkhanov led an extraordinary diplomatic mission sent by the Azerbaijan Republic to conduct negotiations with the Qajar state in Tehran. They were tasked with initiating initial discussions on opening diplomatic representations of the Azerbaijan Republic in Tehran, Tabriz, Rasht, and Mashhad, as well as preparing general provisions for future conventions on trade, postal and telegraphic services, customs, and agreements regarding sea, rail, and road transportation, and coordinating mutual measures for border protection. On June 4, 1919, Ismayil Khan Ziyadkhanov signed a draft contract consisting of 14 articles with the representative of the Qajar state's Ministry of Foreign Affairs, Motesamol Sultan. As a result of the activities of this mission, agreements were reached on the establishment of the Permanent Diplomatic Representation of the Azerbaijan People's Republic in Tehran and the opening of consulates in several regions of the Qajar state.

== Death ==
There are various opinions regarding the assassination of Ismayil Khan Ziyadkhanov. According to Anvar Chingizoglu in his monograph "Ismayil Khan Ziyadkhanov," he was shot by the Red Army military field court after Azerbaijan was occupied by the XI Red Army. On May 5, 1920, Ismayil Khan Ziyadkhanov's property and land were confiscated by a special decree of the Azerbaijan Revolutionary Committee. However, according to Iltifat Aliyarli and Tahir Behbudov, Ismayil Khan Ziyadkhanov was arrested after the April invasion in Ganja, during the Ganja uprising. He was then shot on Nargin Island on June 6, 1920, by the order of Semyon Pankratov, the head of the Special Department of the Political Administration of the XI Red Army.

== Family ==
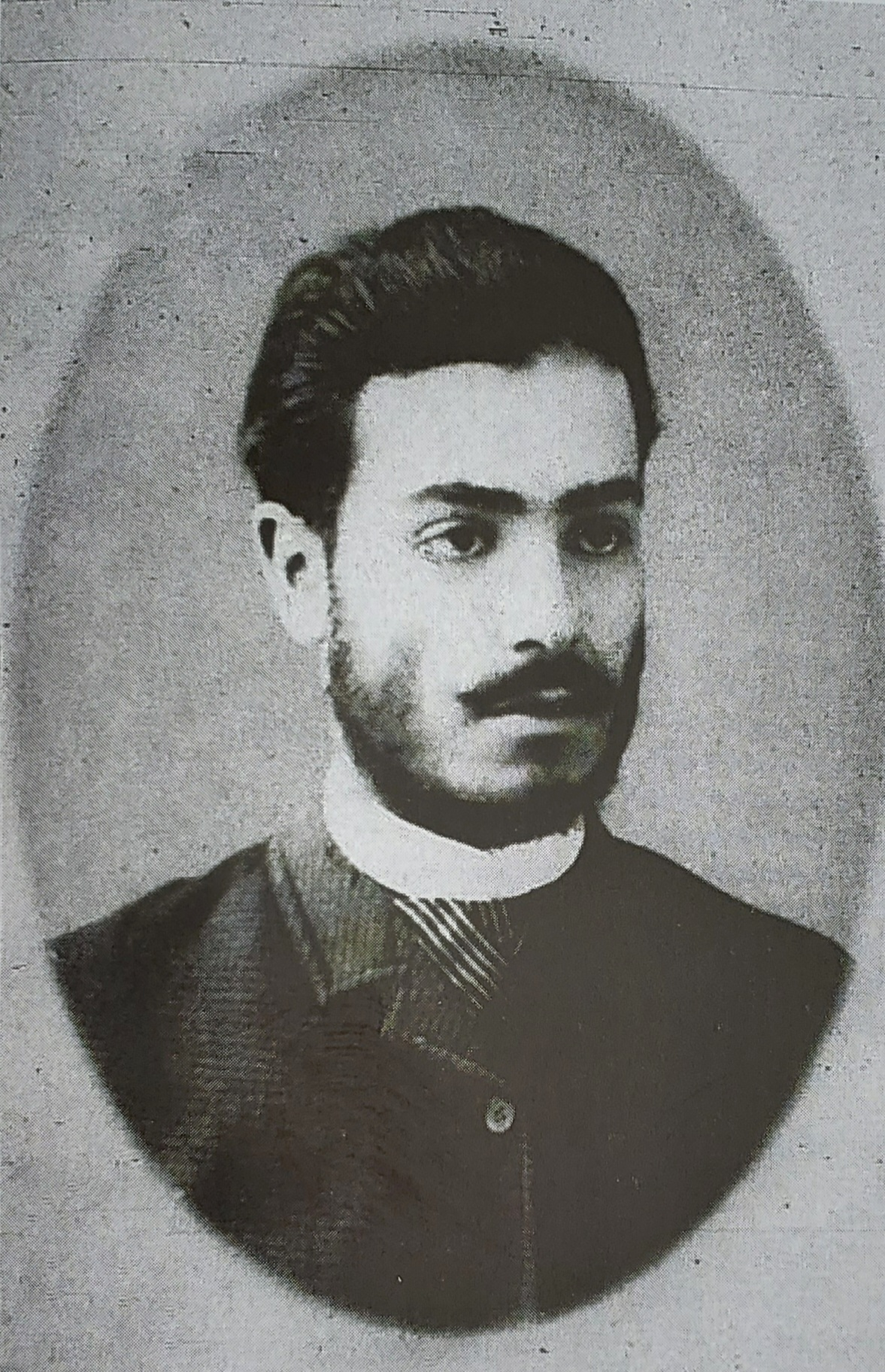
Ismayil Khan Ziyadkhanli in his youth at the end of the 19th century

Ismayil Khan Ziyadkhanov's father, Abdul Fateh Agha Ziyadkhanov, was born in 1843 and was the grandson of Javad Khan. Abdul Fateh Agha married Azarhumayun Khanum Qovanli-Qajar, the daughter of Bahman Mirza Qovanli-Qajar, and from this marriage, they had sons named Ismayil Khan, Shahverdi Khan, and Adil Khan, as well as daughters named Sultan Beyim, Fakhritaj Beyim, Shirin Beyim, Khirda Beyim, and Qamartaj Beyim.

Ismayil Khan Ziyadkhanov married Senubar Nakhchivanski, the granddaughter of Ehsan Khan Kengerli, the last khan of the Nakhchivan Khanate, and the daughter of Colonel Amanullah Khan Nakhchivanski and the poetess Khanbike Khanum. They had children named Abdul Fateh Khan, Javad Khan, Maleyka, and Khurshid.

Ismayil Khan Ziyadkhanov's younger brother, Shahverdi Khan Ziyadkhan, served as an officer in the Tsarist Army and the Azerbaijani Republic Army. His younger brother, Adil Khan Ziyadkhanov, served as the Deputy Foreign Minister of the Azerbaijan Republic and as the Ambassador of the Azerbaijan Republic to Iran.

== Memory ==
In his book "The Quality, Structure, and Current Situation of the Azerbaijan Republic" written in 1923, Mahammad Amin Rasulzade referred to Ismayil Khan Ziyadkhanov as the martyr of Azerbaijan's independence.

After the restoration of Azerbaijan's independence, one of the streets in the city of Ganja was named after Ismayil Khan Ziyadkhanov, and a bas-relief of Ismayil Khan Ziyadkhanov was installed on the wall of Adil Khan Ziyadkhanov's property. Since 1972, the Ganja History and Ethnography Museum has been operating in this property.

In 2014, in the Quba Memorial Complex dedicated to the March Genocide and related to the Shamakhi district, there is a section with photos of Ismayil Khan Ziyadkhanov and information about the struggle he led against the Dashnaks during that period.

In 2021, by the decision of the Scientific Council of the Institute of Manuscripts of Azerbaijan, the monograph "Ismayil Khan Ziyadkhanov" authored by Enver Chingizoglu and Aydin Ziyadkhanli was published.

== See also ==
- Shahverdi Khan Ziyadkhanov
