= Khan's Garden (Baku) =

Historical garden in Azerbaijan

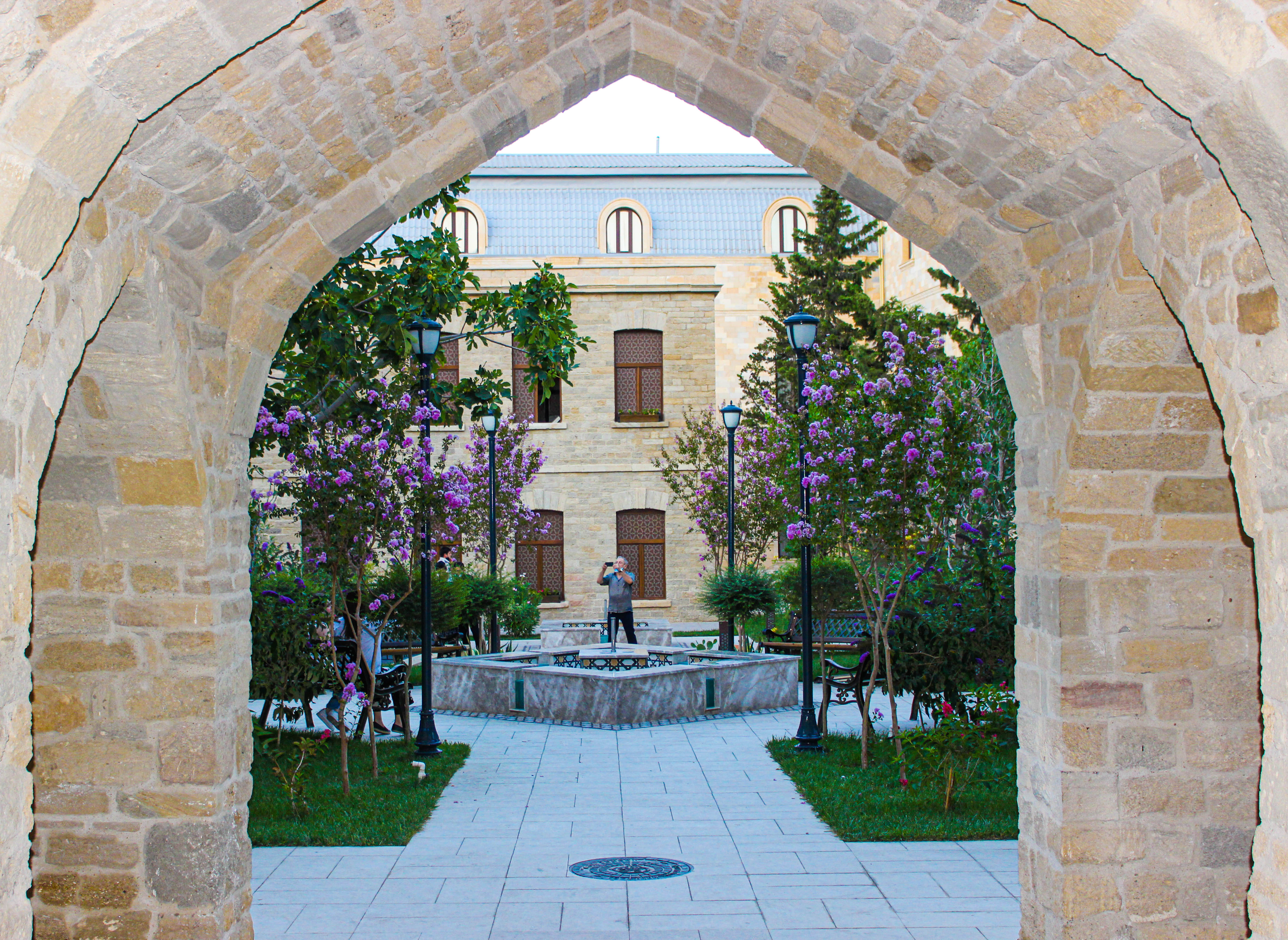

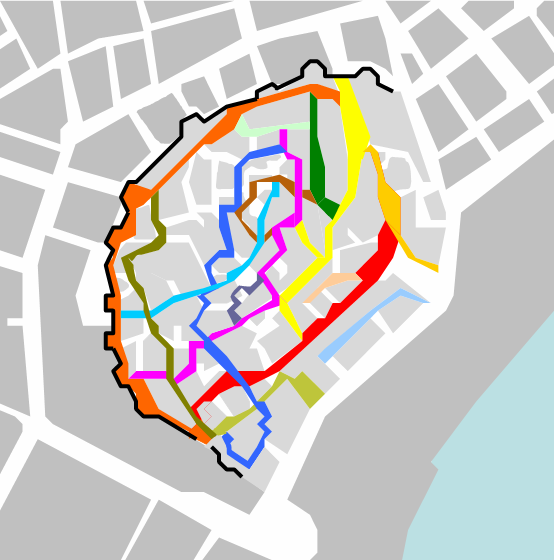
- Location within Streets in Old City, Baku, Azerbaijan
- Type: Historical Park
- Location: Old City, Baku, Azerbaijan
- Coordinates: 40°22′5″N 49°50′13″E
- Created: 1754
- Operator: "Icherisheher" State Historical-Architectural Reserve

The Khan's Garden (Azerbaijani: Xan bağı, Persian: باغ خان) is a historical garden located in Icherisheher, being part of the Baku Khans Palace's complex. The Khan's Garden is located in the first courtyard of the palace in front of the house that belonged to the Khan's family. There is a small pool in the center of the garden. Also, on the territory of the garden, there is an ovdan (water reservoir) and a tandir.

In the park have been preserved such trees as the eldar pine, plane tree, cypress, maple, etc., being integral elements of the flora of Azerbaijan. In addition, the silver spruce, white acacia, common jasmine, thuja orientalis, and various rose bushes grow in the corresponding area.

In 2018, the restoration and reconstruction work began on the territory of the Baku Khans Palace complex.

== History ==
The Baku khans' palace was built in the ancient nucleus of the city - in Icherisheher. The construction of the complex began in 1754 on the order of Abdulrahim-bey and Mehtigulu-bey. The first buildings of the complex were raised along Boyuk Gala (the Big Fortress) street. Until the end of the 19th century, the number of buildings increased in the direction of the courtyard. Before the April occupation, there were springs and a garden in the first courtyard of the palace. The territory of the complex, along with the residential buildings, also included the edifice of a small mosque and an underground bathhouse.

Extensive information about the Palace of the Baku Khans has come down to our times thanks to the measurement work carried out on 30 October 1809 and the constituted drawings. The drawings showed the detailed plans of the complex marked as "The Khan's Palace and the Houses of the Runaway Beys". The complex of Baku Khans is located on the left side at the entrance into the Baku Fortress through the Shamakhi Gate.

The first historical plan of the Palace of the Baku Khans, which has come to our times, reflects a vast residential complex formed around five courtyards. The first large courtyard, which belonged to the khan's family, is located first. The center of its territory is occupied by a garden with a small pool. In the notes to the plan, this garden is listed as "the former Khan's garden."

== Restoration works ==
In 2018, the restoration and reconstruction works began on the territory of the Baku Khans Palace complex. As part of the project, a site that had been polluted with household waste for many years was cleaned up. Then an archaeological research group was brought on the territory and a scientific research was carried out. The ovdan and tandir found in this area were mothballed.

According to the Department of the Icherisheher State Historical and Architectural Reserve, a new strip of green spaces created within the framework of the project will be merged with the Archaeological Park and turned into a single recreation area. In some sites, stone slabs will be laid on the ground, and others will be landscaped. When decorating the park, it is planned to use such decorative means as the portal, a suspended structure allowing the possibility of obtaining natural light from the facade.

== Description ==
In the park have been preserved such trees as the Eldar pine, plane tree, cypress, maple, etc., which are integral elements of the flora of Azerbaijan. In addition, the silver spruce, white acacia, common jasmine, thuja orientalis, and various rose bushes grow in the corresponding area.

== Literature ==
- Tahirova, Aydan (2016). Дворцовый комплекс бакинских ханов (PDF). Баку: Elm və təhsil nəşriyyatı.
- Salamzadeh, Abdulvahab (1964). Архитектура Азербайджана XVI-XIX вв. Baku: Издательство Академии наук Азербайджанской ССР.
