= Adil Khan Ziyadkhanov =

Azerbaijani statesman and diplomat

Adil Khan Ziyadkhanov Adil xan Ziyadxanov
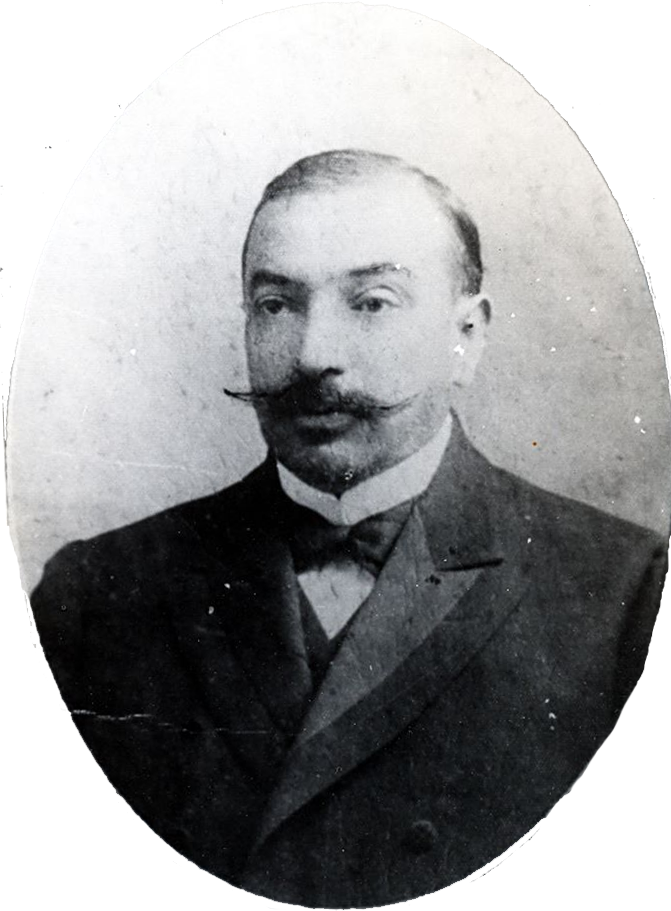

Deputy Minister of Foreign Affairs of Azerbaijan Democratic Republic (ADR)
- In office 25 October 1918 – 7 December 1918
- President: Alimardan Topchubashov (Chairman of Azerbaijani Parliament)
- Preceded by: Office created
- Succeeded by: Fatali Khan Khoyski

Azerbaijani ambassador to Iran
- In office 4 October 1919 – 22 June 1921

Personal details
- Born: September 25, 1877 Ganja, Elisabethpol Governorate, Russian Empire
- Died: 14 December 1957 (aged 80) Istanbul, Turkey
- Party: Musavat

Adil Khan Ziyadkhanov (Azerbaijani: Adil xan Ziyadxanov) — Azerbaijani statesman and diplomat.

== Biography ==
He was born in Elisabethpol, Russian Empire to Abulfat agha Ziyadkhanov and Azer Humayun khanum in 1877. His father was great-grandson of Javad Khan of Ganja on paternal side and Jafar Qoli khan Donboli on maternal side, while his mother was a daughter of Bahman Mirza – thus a member of Qajar dynasty from both sides. He had elder brothers called Shahverdi Khan and Ismail Khan. He graduated from Moscow University faculty of Law on 1 June 1894. He worked as an attorney in Elizabethpol and Baku, participated in peace meetings in Tbilisi aimed at putting an end to Armeno-Tatar massacres in 1906, defending Muslims. He travelled Europe in 1908 and published his memoirs in "My 3 month tour in Europe" in 1909. He was one of the seven elected and temporary members of the Elizabethpol Muslim Executive Council in 1917.

== Work in government ==
He was appointed to be deputy of Alimardan Topchubashov – Minister of Foreign Affairs in 1918. However, since Topchubashov was in Istanbul, he was also the acting minister. He met with William Montgomerie Thomson in this capacity on 16 November 1918. He also co-authored the official letter from Azerbaijan to Woodrow Wilson alongside Khoyski.

His primary concerns were Azerbaijan's recognition in Paris Peace Conference and situation of Azerbaijanis in Armenia. He was the author of "Azerbaijan" – a booklet intended for distribution in Paris Peace Conference. He headed a delegation to Qajar Iran in March 1919, signed several bilateral treaties and a significant friendship pact, achieving de jure recognition from Iran. In April, Azerbaijani embassy started to operate in Tehran, with consulates in Tabriz and Rasht, a vice-consulate in Mashhad, consulate-agencies in Khoy and Ahar. He was later appointed as ambassador to Iran on 4 October 1919, however he stepped on Iranian soil only on 15 January 1920.

== Life in Iran and Turkey ==
He later wrote promotional book "Azerbaijan, its history, literature and politics" in Azerbaijani and French during his time in Iran. Started a charity organization and founded cultural society which taught Azerbaijani language. He wrote another book in Persian "Flight of the Pen" in 2 volumes. Ziyadkhanov's relatives were purged after establishment of Soviet power in Azerbaijan. He later served in various Iranian ministries and departments. His last place of work was Azerbaijani Railway and Shipping Bureau in Tabriz, 1929. He would later move on to Turkey and lecture Russian language at Istanbul University until his death in 1957.

== Personal life ==
He was proficient in Turkish, Persian, Russian, French, English and German. He was politically Turanist and often defended rights of Azerbaijanis in Iran. Religiously he was a Twelver Shia, made pilgrimages to Karbala in 1927. Wolseley Heig suspected him to be a Bolshevik sympathiser.

=== Family ===
He was married to Reyhanet khanum (second daughter of Hasan Bakikhanov) and had five daughters Mahrukh Begüm, who later was married to the son of Huseyngulu khan Khoyski (elder brother of Fatali Khan Khoyski), Melek, Turan, Saltanat and Ziver.

== Works ==
- My 3-month tour in Europe (Ganja, 1909) – Republished in Baku, 1993 and 2012.
- Azerbaijan, its history, literature and politics (French: Aperçu sur l’histoire, la littérature et la politique de l’Azerbeidjan) – Baku, 1919
- Flight of the Pen (in Persian) – Republished in Baku, 1993.
- Javad Khan (in Turkish) – 1943
