= Shahverdi Khan Ziyadkhanov =

Russian general

- Şahverdi xan Ziyadxanov
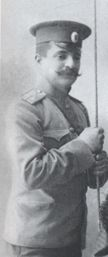
- Born: October 15, 1869; Yelizavetpol; Russian Empire
- Died: May 8, 1919 (aged 49); Ganja, Azerbaijan
- Military career
- Service years: 1890–1919
- Rank: sergeant major lieutenant colonel
- Conflicts: Russo-Japanese War; World War I
- Awards: , , ,

Shahverdi Khan Ziyadkhanovor Shahverdi Khan Ziyadkhan (October 15 [O.S. October 3], 1869 – May 8, 1919) was a Russian officer of the Tsar's army and the Azerbaijan Democratic Republic Army, and was the brother of Ismail Khan and Adil Khan Ziyadkhanov.

He participated in the Russo-Japanese War and World War I. In 1905, during the Russo-Japanese War, he was awarded the fourth-degree Order of St. Anna with the inscription "For Bravery" and the third-degree Order of St. Stanislav (with swords and ribbon). During World War I, he was appointed as an assistant commander in the Tatar Cavalry Regiment of the Wild Division. In 1915, for his distinction in battle against the enemy, he was awarded the third-degree Order of St. Anna (with swords and ribbon).

He served in the army of the Azerbaijan Republic with the rank of lieutenant colonel.

== Life and education ==
Ziyadkhanov Shahverdi Khan, son of Abulfat Agha, was born on October 15 (October 3 according to the old calendar) in 1869 in the city of Ganja. His father, Abulfat Khan, was the grandson of Javad Khan, the last khan of Ganja. He graduated from Ganja Gymnasium with a first-class degree and from the Yelizavetgrad Junker School with a second-class degree.

== Military service ==
=== The first years of service ===
Shahverdi Khan began his service on November 29, 1890, as a private in the 3rd squadron of the 44th Nizhny Novgorod Dragoon Regiment.

On August 12, 1891, he was sent to the Junker School. Although he was initially assigned to the lower class, on July 14, 1892, he was promoted to the upper class. He graduated from the school on August 1, 1893, with a second-class degree as a standard-bearer junker and returned to the regiment. On September 4, 1893, he was assigned to the 5th squadron. On January 15, 1895, he was promoted to the rank of Cornet. On April 29, 1895, he was dispatched to the Caucasus Engineer Brigade, located near the village of Tioneti in the Tiflis Governorate, to acquire skills in engineering, fortifications, railways, and other military matters. After completing the course with a "very good" mark, he was sent to the 2nd detachment of the Caucasus Reserve Cavalry Regiment from September 1 to October 23, 1895.

In 1896, from August 22 to October 26, he was sent on a mission to the military cavalry regiment located in the village of Armavir in the Kuban region. On February 5, 1896, he was transferred to the 3rd squadron of the regiment. From July 14 to 24, 1898, he temporarily commanded the 2nd squadron. On March 15, 1898, he was promoted to the military rank of Lieutenant. From August 27 to October 1, 1898, he was on a mission with the military cavalry regiment in Baku. From October 1 to 13, 1899, and from September 18 to November 9, he temporarily commanded the 6th squadron of the regiment.

From June 15 to 23, 1902, he was sent to Aleksandropol for the military field expedition of officers. On March 15, 1903, he was promoted to the rank of Staff Captain. From May 29 to June 1 of the same year, he temporarily commanded the 2nd squadron.

=== In the Russo-Japanese War ===
From March 26 to September 6, 1904, he was stationed in the city of Omsk under the command of the Siberian Military District. He commanded a reserve cavalry detachment formed in the city of Kurgan. On November 20, 1904, he was sent to the 1st Sunzhensk-Vladikavkaz Cossack Regiment with the rank of Podyasavul. He arrived at his service location on December 27, 1904, and began serving in the second hundred. From June 17, 1905, he started serving in the first hundred.

On June 20, 1905, he was awarded the fourth-degree Order of St. Anna with the inscription "For Bravery." On August 31 of the same year, for distinguishing himself in battle against the Japanese, he was awarded the third-degree Order of St. Stanislav (with swords and ribbon).

=== Next period ===
After the Russo-Japanese War ended, on December 16, 1905, he was sent to the 2nd Dagestan Cavalry Regiment. Later, on April 12, 1906, he was assigned to the 44th Nizhny Novgorod Dragoon Regiment. On April 11, 1907, he was returned to his previous regiment.

On December 26, 1908, he was granted permission to wear the commemorative badge given for the 200th anniversary of the 17th Nizhny Novgorod Dragoon Regiment. On June 25, 1909, he was awarded the "In Commemoration of the 200th Anniversary of the Battle of Poltava" medal. On October 7, 1909, he was granted permission to wear the jubilee badge for the "50th Anniversary of the Conquest of Eastern Caucasus." From May 5 to October 4, 1910, he was on a mission with the 17th Nizhny Novgorod Dragoon Regiment. On December 13, 1910, he was appointed senior officer for special assignments under the governor of Yelizavetpol. On February 24, 1911, he was appointed to the army cavalry regiment and began serving in the Ministry of Internal Affairs. On December 6, 1911, he was promoted to the rank of Captain.

=== During World War I ===
On September 27, 1914, General A. Arkhangelsky from the central headquarters informed Yelizavetpol Governor G. Kovalyov via telegram that, according to a high command issued on September 26, Shahverdi Khan Ziyadkhanov was appointed as the assistant commander of the Tatar Cavalry Regiment, which was formed as part of the Wild Division. The commander of the Tatar Cavalry Regiment, which consisted of 2 officers, 3 military officials, 1 regiment cleric, 575 cavalrymen, and 68 civilians, was Lieutenant Colonel P. Polovtsov, with his assistants being V. Staroselski and Sh. Ziyadkhanov. The organization of the regiment was directly assigned to Cavalry Captain Shahverdi Khan.

He participated in combat operations on the Southwestern Front. On February 14, 1915, by order No. 154 of the Commander-in-Chief of the armies on the Southwestern Front, N. Ivanov, he was awarded the third-degree Order of St. Anna (with swords and ribbon) for his distinction in battle against the enemy.

On April 30, 1915, during a battle with the enemy near the village of Nepolkuts by the Prut River, he sustained a severe concussion to the head and was evacuated to Tiflis.

As of September 15, 1916, Captain Shahverdi Khan Ziyadkhanov was under the command of the reserve military cavalry detachment subordinate to the headquarters of the Caucasus Military District.

=== in the Republic of Azerbaijan ===
Shahverdi Khan continued his service in the Tatar Cavalry Regiment, later serving in the Independent Azerbaijani Corps and then in the army of the Azerbaijan Republic. In the list of the newly formed Azerbaijani army dated February 3, 1919, it is noted that he held the rank of lieutenant colonel. On February 4, 1919, he was appointed chairman of the commission established for the reception of logistical supplies. In an order issued by the military department of the Azerbaijan Republic on April 17, 1919, it was noted that Ziyadkhanov had successfully transferred military assets left by the Turks in the country to the army's balance. On March 29, 1919, he was appointed to the III Sheki Cavalry Regiment. On May 11 of that year, the temporary commander of the Cavalry Regiment, Major General Amashukeli, submitted a report to the Central Headquarters.

Along with the list of awards, I am requesting, according to decision No. 43 of the Officers' Society of the Tatar Cavalry Regiment, that the time Lieutenant Colonel Shahverdi Khan Ziyadkhanov spent in evacuation be counted starting from May 6, 1917, and that he be granted the next military rank.

Khan-Ziyadkhanov died from typhus in early June 1919 while fulfilling his military duties in Ganja (some sources mention June 6 or 9, while an order issued in September lists his death date as May 8). General Shikhlinski, who was temporarily acting as Minister of War, in recognition of his service to the army, ordered that his family be provided with funds to cover medical expenses related to his illness, funeral costs, and a one-time payment of 5,000 rubles. Additionally, Shikhlinski took responsibility for petitioning the Parliament to grant a pension to his family.

== Family ==
Shahverdi Khan was married to Agja Beyim, the daughter of Mohammad Agha Abraxanov. There is no information about their children.

His father, Abulfat Agha Ziyadkhanov, was the grandson of Javad Khan. He was born in Ganja in 1843 and married Azerhumayun Khanum Qovanli-Qajar, the daughter of Bahman Mirza Qovanli-Qajar.

His mother, Azerhumayun Khanum Qovanli-Qajar, was a Qajar princess and a calligrapher. She was born in the city of Shusha, the daughter of Bahman Mirza. She was known as Şahzada Khanum and was a skilled calligrapher. Princess Khanum married Abulfat Agha Ziyadkhanov.

From this marriage, they had sons named Ismail Khan, Shahverdi Khan, and Adil Khan, and daughters named Sultan Beyim, Fakhrithaj Beyim, Shirin Beyim, Khirda Beyim, and Qamarthaj Beyim.

== Awards ==
Orders awarded to him for distinguishing himself in battles during the Russo-Japanese War and World War I:

- — In 1905, he was awarded the fourth-degree Order of St. Anna with the inscription "For Bravery."
- — In 1905, he was awarded the third-degree Order of St. Stanislav (with swords and ribbon).
- — On June 25, 1909, he was awarded the "In Commemoration of the 200th Anniversary of the Battle of Poltava" medal.
- — In 1915, he was awarded the third-degree Order of St. Anna (with swords and ribbon).

== See also ==
- Ismail Khan Ziyadkhanov
- Adil Khan Ziyadkhanov
