= Bakikhanovs =

The Bakikhanovs or Badkubehs (Azerbaijani: Bakıxanovlar, South Azerbaijani: بادکوبهه, Persian: بدکوبه ها) are an Azerbaijani noble family.

== History ==
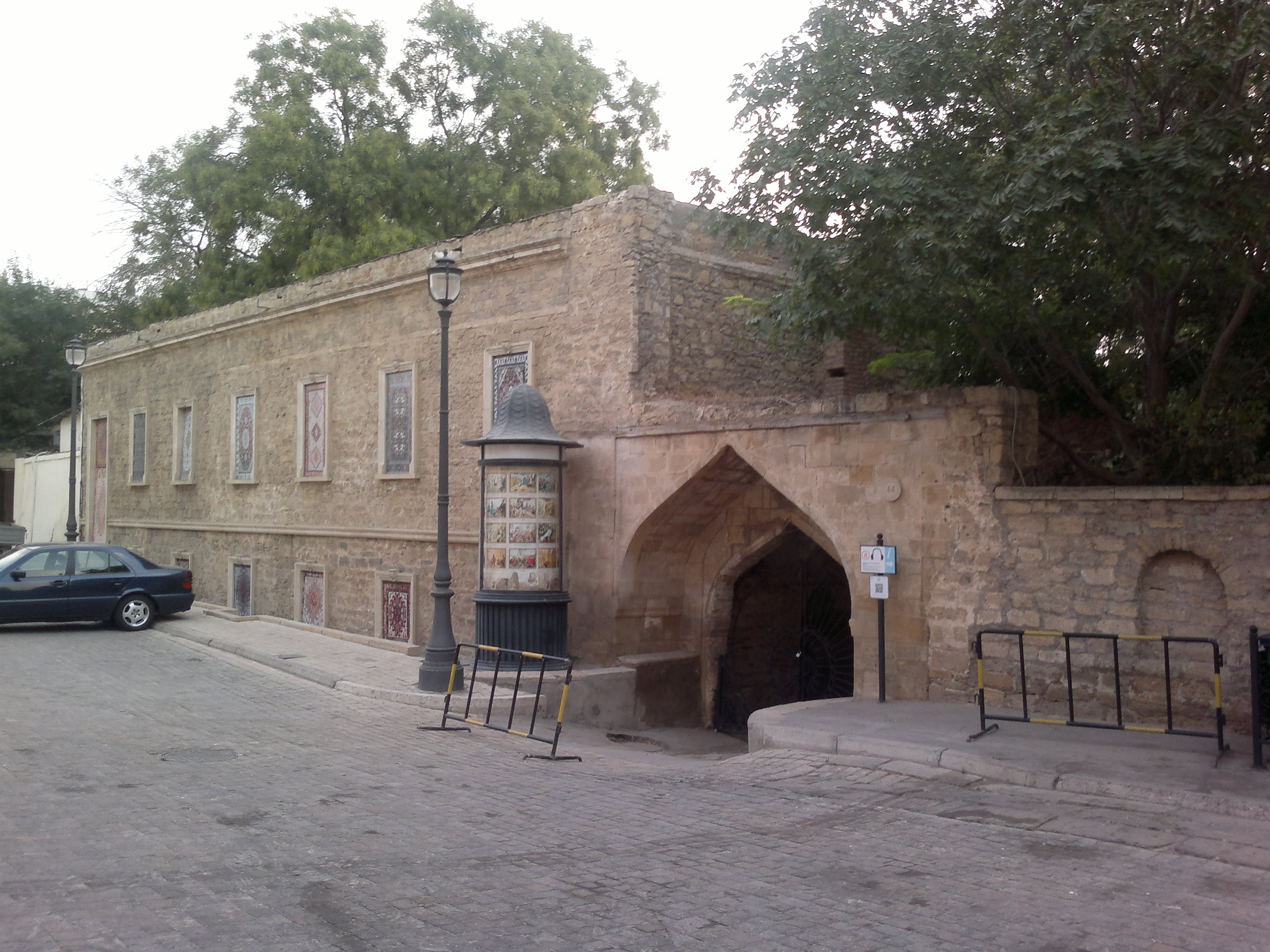
Baku Khans' Palace, Old City

Progenitors of the line arrived in Baku after 1592. According to Abbasgulu Bakikhanov, the ancestors of the family migrated to Baku from Gilan, after a certain "Khan Ahmad affair", which probably meant the end of Malati ruler Sultan Ahmad Khan's reign. He claims ancestors of Baku khans were hailing from Nur and Kujur rulers ruling in Tabaristan, i.e. Paduspanids. First known members of the dynasty were Mammadhusein beg and his son Heybet beg. Heybet beg's elder son Dargahqulu beg was a landlord in Mashtaga who seized the city and killed sultan who was appointed by Safavids, then began to call himself khan, appointing Selim khan as naib of Absheron. He defeated forces of Surkhay khan of Qaziqumuq and later Haji Davud of Shirvan and extended his rule to Shabran and Gobustan. However he lost younger brother Huseinjan beg in battle. Dargahqulu surrendered castle to Mikhail Matyushkin with 700 soldiers in 1723 and was acknowledged by Russian Empire as local ruler. The family adopted the name of Badkubeh after relocating to the city of Arak in Iran, whereas a different segment of the family that stayed and worked with the Russians adopted the name Bakikhanov.

=== Famous members ===
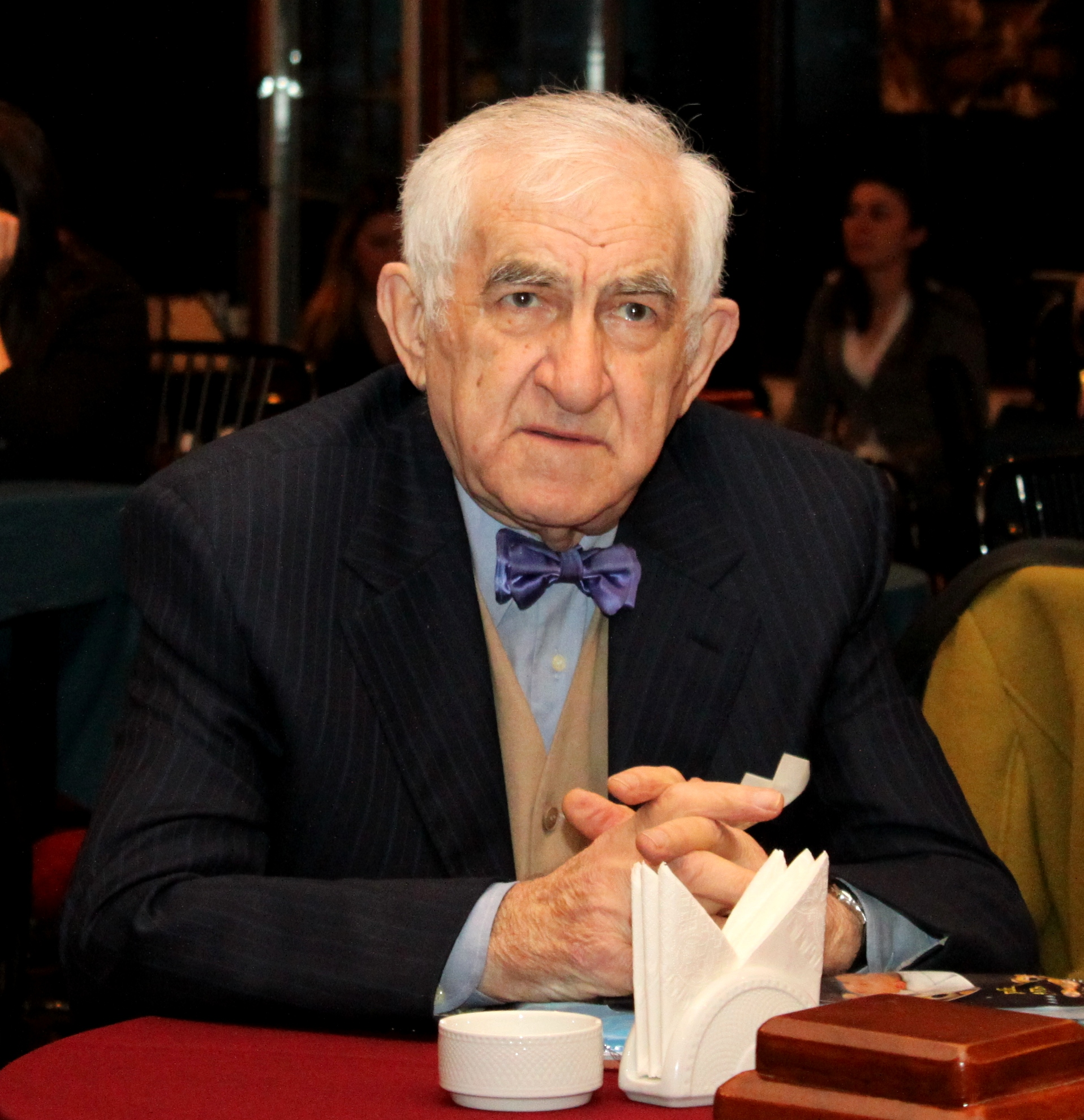
Tofig Bakikhanov, Azerbaijani composer

- Abbasgulu Bakikhanov (1794–1847) – Colonel in Russian army, writer and scholar
- Jafargulu Bakikhanov (1793–1867) – Lieutenant general in Russian army
- Hasan Bakikhanov (8 May 1833 – 28 November 1898) – Major general in Russian army
- Abdulla agha Bakikhanov (1824–1879) – Major general in Russian army
- Ahmad Bakikhanov (1892–1973) – People's Artist of Azerbaijan (1973)
- Tofig Bakikhanov (1930–2026) – Violinist, composer and academic teacher, People's Artist of Azerbaijan (1991)

== Sources ==
- Abbasgulu Bakikhanov, Gulistan-i Iram, Baku, 1951.
