= Jafargulu Bakikhanov =

Azerbaijani noble and Russian general

Jafargulu agha Bakikhanov
- Cəfərqulu ağa Bakıxanov
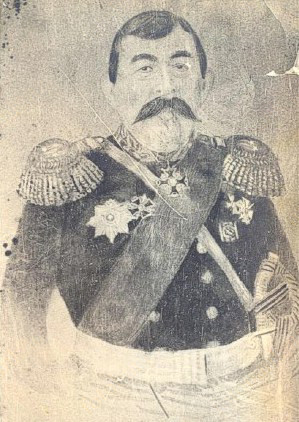
- Born: 6 February 1793; Quba
- Died: 12 October 1867 (aged 74); Quba
- Burial place: Bibi-Heybat Mosque
- Relatives: Mirza Muhammad Khan II (father); Abbasgulu Bakikhanov (elder brother); Hasan Bakikhanov (son)
- Military career
- Allegiance: Russian Empire
- Branch: Imperial Russian Army
- Service years: 1820 - 18 October 1864; 19 April 1866 - 1867
- Rank: Lieutenant general
- Unit: Transcaucasian Muslim Cavalry Regiment
- Conflicts: Russo-Persian War; Russo-Turkish War; Caucasian War

Jafargulu Bakikhanov (Azerbaijani: Cəfərqulu ağa Mirzə Məhəmməd xan oğlu Bakıxanov) was an Azerbaijani noble and Russian general.

== Life ==
He was said to be born in either 1796 or 1799 in some resources. But the latest research revealed he was born on 6 February 1793 in Quba to Mirza Muhammad Khan II and Sofia khanum. He has received the title naib of Mushkur in 1827 and Shabran districts in the 1830s. He was also naib of Buduq.

He entered the military in 1820. Russo-Persian War of 1826–1828 was his first war experience, followed by Russo-Turkish War of 1828–1829. He participated in Mil battle in which Erzurum serasker Salih Pasha was captured. He was promoted to the rank of podporuchik following capture of Hasankale and Erzurum.

== Imprisonment ==
Citizens of Quba revolted in 1837 against Russian oppression and Jafargulu's harsh taxation. He was summoned to Shamakhi, then to Tbilisi and removed from his earlier posts. He was later sent to Warsaw and his elder brother Abbasgulu was summoned to Tbilisi to give an explanation about events. Confused, Abbasgulu tried to explain they were not perpetrators, but victims as their cousin Ali Pasha was also killed during the rebellion.

== Military career ==
He was promoted to poruchik rank in 1838 and to that of captain in 1841 during the Caucasian war. In the campaigns of 1842-1843 Bakikhanov fought against the mountaineers in the Samur region and Mountainous Dagestan; a service for which he was awarded with rank stabsrittmeister of Cossack Regiment of the Imperial Guard and subsequent appointment in Separate Caucasian Corps and the following year was promoted to the rittmeister of the Guard . In 1844-1848 he was also in Dagestan and participated in the battles of Salta and Gergebil, including the battle against Haji Murad. He especially distinguished himself during the storming of the last aul - Akhty - in 1848. For his services, he was promoted to colonel on June 6, 1848 and was awarded a gold sword with the inscription "For bravery".

After 25 years of service, he was awarded the Order of St. George (4th rank) on 26 November 1850 alongside being promoted to major-general. He attended the coronation of Alexander II in Moscow on 7 September 1856, representing Derbent delegation. He was stationed in Caucasian Army since 1857, however for political reasons, he was dismissed from service with a uniform and a full salary pension on October 18, 1864 after being promoted to the rank of lieutenant general. However, he was recalled to service on 19 April 1866.

== Family and death ==
He died in 1867, Quba while his body was taken to Baku and was buried in Bibiheybət. He spoke Azerbaijani and Russian in addition to Lezgi. He was married to Chimnaz khanum - a daughter of Lezgin bek Khanbutay beg Yargunvi (1761-1823). They had three children:

- Nurjahan khanum (6 July 1832 – 1912)
- Hasan Bakikhanov (8 May 1833 – 28 November 1898)
- Ahmad Bakikhanov (16 June 1837 – 13 April 1882)
- Ayna khanum (b. 8 September 1837)

== Awards and decorations ==
- Order of Saint Anna (3rd rank) - 1830
- Order of Saint Vladimir (4th rank) - 1830
- Golden Weapon "For Bravery" - 1848
- Order of Saint Vladimir (3rd rank) - 1849
- Order of Saint George (4th rank) - 1850
- Order of Saint Stanislaus (1st rank) - 1851
- Order of Saint Anna (1st rank) - 1861
