= Mirza Muhammad Khan II =

Khan of Baku (1770–1836)

Khan of Baku
- Reign: 1784–1791
- Coronation: 1784
- Predecessor: Malik Muhammad Khan
- Successor: Muhammadquli Khan
- Regent: Khadija Bika
- Born: 1770; Baku
- Died: 1836 (aged 65–66); Quba
- Burial: Quba
- Spouses: Khanbika khanum
- House: Bakikhanovs
- Father: Malik Muhammad Khan
- Mother: Khadija Bika
- Religion: Shia Islam

Mirza Muhammad Khan II (1770–1836) – the third Khan of Baku.

== Early life ==
Mirza Muhammad Khan II was born in 1770 to Malik Muhammad Khan and Khadija Bika, sister of Fatali Khan of Quba. He was named after his grandfather, Mirza Muhammad Khan I, the founding Khan of the Baku Khanate. He ascended to the throne when his father went for pilgrimage and regency was assumed by his mother. His reign saw the Khanate's complete incorporation to Quba, to the point that Fatali Khan invited a Russian garrison to be stationed in Baku in 1785 in place of Mirza Muhammad. However, Fatali Khan died on 22 March 1789 in Baku, before further military campaigns.

== Abdication ==
Relations were strained between Ahmed Khan of Quba and Mirza Muhammad after 1791. Following the death of Fatali Khan, Muhammadquli Agha – the uncle of Mirza Muhammad – tried to usurp Baku khanate using the inexperience of both Ahmed Khan and Mirza Muhammad as justification. He assured Ahmed Khan of his loyalty if he were to be awarded the khanate. Ahmed Khan sent an army contingent to Baku to enthrone Muhammadquli agha. Since Baku's army only consisted of about 500 men, he abdicated in favor of his uncle.

== Later life ==
Mirza Muhammad fled to Quba with his family, including his wife and his mother. Muhammadquli betrayed treaties and claimed independence. In response, Ahmed khan mobilized troops and marched on Baku to restore Mirza Muhammad. However he was defeated by Muhammadquli. Ahmed Khan died in March 1791 and was succeeded by his 13-year-old brother - Shaykhali Khan. Mirza Muhammad again was given army to march on Baku. Shaykali further asked Count Ivan Gudovich to besiege Baku. Muhammadquli quickly sent his letter of submission to Russia, asking for help. Confused, Gudovich ordered counter-admiral Pyotr Shishkin to resolve the problem to Russia's benefit. However the order was delayed for unknown reasons and Baku was bombarded. Muhammadquli khan made peace with Shaykhali and soon fell ill and died.

== Struggle for throne ==
He was appointed as Khan again in 1792 by Shaykhali Khan. However, city nobles headed by Qasim beg Selimkhanov declared Mirza Muhammad's cousin Huseyngulu khan as their new khan. Defeated, Mirza Muhammad fled again to Quba. He then besieged Baku and forced Huseyngulu to divide the khanate's revenues. Huseyngulu made a night attack on Balakhani with reinforcements from Shirvan in 1795 and forced Mirza Muhammad to take refuge in Quba yet again.

Mirza Muhammad took forces from Shaykhali and positioned on Absheron, blocking trade and supply routes. Huseyngulu sent Manaf to beg Selimkhanov to ask Gudovich for help. He ambushed Mirza Muhammad and captured him with his family. His younger brother Husein agha was the only one to escape battle, go to Quba and tell the story. Soon through Mostafa khan's help, the cousins made peace and Mirza Muhammad went back to Quba, while retaining his income from Baku oil fields.

Huseyngulu khan was detained by Agha Mohammad shah in Karabakh in 1797. Hearing developments, Mirza Muhammad rushed to seize Baku. However, Agha Mohammad's assassination and Huseyngulu khan's fast arrival ruined his plans. After a new treaty, he positioned himself in Mashtaga, acting as vice-khan.

In 1803, he was attacked by Huseyngulu again in Mashtaga, this time with Mostafa khan's help. He fled to Quba and started to look for a way to gather troops. He joined the army of Russian general Sergei Bulgakov in July 1806. Together they captured Baku on 6 October 1806.

== Governor of Quba ==
He was made provisional governor of Quba in 1809.

== Family ==
He had three wives: Khanbika khanum (m. 1800, d. 1806) – daughter of Fatali Khan; Sofia – a Georgian woman, daughter of a certain Behram bagh; Kheyr-un Nisa khanum – daughter of Rza Effendi of Khinalug.

Offspring:

With Sofia (m. 1791, d. 1836) :

- Abbasgulu Bakikhanov (1794–1847)
- Jafargulu Bakikhanov (1796–1867)

With Kheyr-un Nisa khanum (m. 1807, d. 1861):

- Javad Bakikhanov (1808–1866)
- Qadir Bakikhanov (b. 1817)
- Mustafagulu Bakikhanov (b. 1822)
- Abdulla Bakikhanov (1824–1879)

He died in 1836 in Quba.
