= Ahmad Bakikhanov =

- Azerbaijani: Əhməd Bakıxanov
- Born: September 5, 1892; Baku, Baku Governorate, Russian Empire
- Died: March 26, 1973 (aged 80); Baku, Azerbaijan SSR, USSR
- Resting place: II Alley of Honor
- Occupations: tar player; Music pedagogue
- Children: Tofig Bakikhanov
- Awards: People's Artist of the Azerbaijan SSR; Honored Artist of the Azerbaijan SSR; Order of the Badge of Honour

Ahmadagha Mammadrza oghlu Bakikhanov (Azerbaijani: Əhmədağa Məmmədrza oğlu Bakıxanov, September 5, 1892–March 26, 1973) was an Azerbaijani tar player, pedagogue. He was awarded the title People's Artiste of the Azerbaijan SSR, and Honored Teacher of the Azerbaijan SSR.

== Biography ==
Bakikhanov was born on September 5, 1892, in Baku. He has performed at music gatherings and concerts in Baku since 1920. From the 1930s, he taught mugham at the Azerbaijan State Conservatoire at the invitation of Uzeyir Hajibeyov and then at the Azerbaijan State Music College.

Bakikhanov created the Azerbaijan State Folk Instruments Ensemble in 1931, and he led the ensemble until the end of his life. The ensemble includes tar, saz, oud, qanun, naqareh, oboe and fortepiano.

Bakikhanov is the author of such note publications as “Azerbaijani folk colors” (1964), “Azerbaijan rhythmic mughams” (1968), “Mugham, song, color” (1975). A branch of the Azerbaijan State Museum of Musical Culture has been established in his Bakikhanov's apartment.

Bakikhanov died on March 26, 1973, in Baku. He was buried in the II Alley of Honor. In 1994, a republican competition was held for students and young people to play mugham on a tar, dedicated to the 100th anniversary of Ahmad Bakikhanov.

== Awards ==
- Honored Teacher of the Azerbaijan SSR — June 17, 1943
- Honored Artist of the Azerbaijan SSR — 1964
- People's Artiste of the Azerbaijan SSR — March 23, 1973
- Order of the Badge of Honour

== Literature ==
- Енциклопедия Азербайджанского Мугама. Baku: Шарг-Гарб. 2012. p. 268.
