= Baku Khanate =

Khanate under Iranian control, 1747 to 1806

Coordinates: 40°28′N 49°50′E

Baku Khanate خانات باکو
- 1747–1806
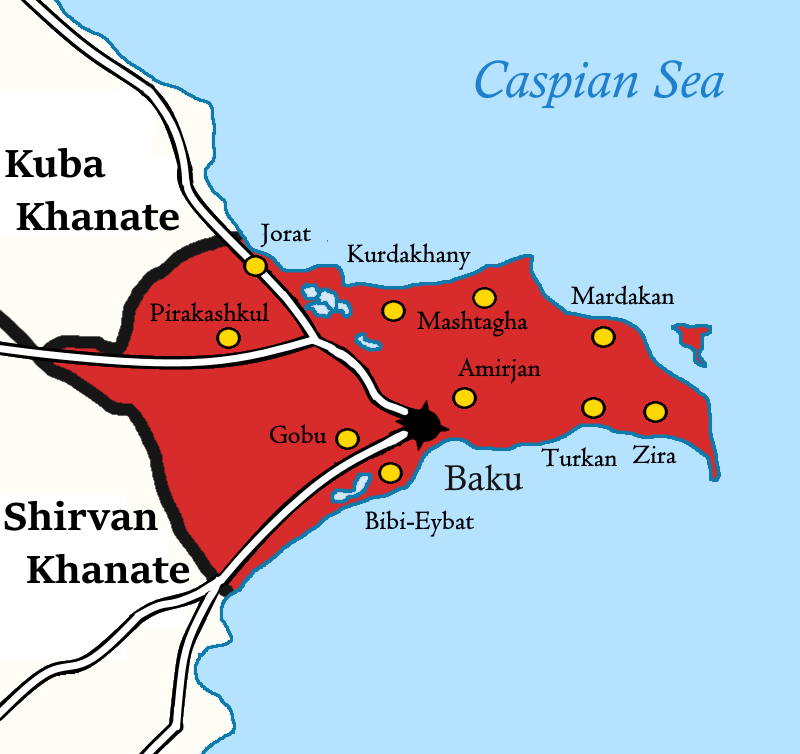
- Baku Khanate and its borders 1806.
- Status: Khanate; Under Iranian suzerainty
- Capital: Baku
- Common languages: Persian (official, literature); Tat language (primary)
- Religion: Shia Islam
- Khan
  - 1747–1768: Mirza Muhammad Khan I (first)
  - 1792–1806: Hosein Qoli Khan Badkubeh (last)
- History
  - Established: 1747
  - Disestablished: 1806
Preceded by	Succeeded by
Afsharid Iran	Shemakha Governorate
- Today part of: Azerbaijan

The Baku Khanate (Persian: خانات باکو, romanized: Khānāt-e Bāku), was a khanate under Iranian suzerainty, which controlled the city of Baku and its surroundings from 1747 to 1806.

== Background ==
The city of Baku, located in the South Caucasus, was originally part of the Shirvan province of Safavid Iran. Dargah Qoli Beg, whose family was originally from Mazandaran, governed the area in the early half of the 18th century. Following the collapse of the Safavid government in 1722, Iranian authority in the South Caucasus started to dwindle. During the Russo-Persian War of 1722–1723, Dargah Qoli acknowledged Russian rule and retained his position until his dismissal in 1730, which occurred due to cooperating with Iran. He then went into the service of the Iranian military leader Nader, under whom he served as a commander. Following the withdrawal of the Russians, Dargah Qoli was re-appointed as governor of Baku.

By 1735, however, the former Iranian holdings in the South Caucasus had been restored due to the efforts of Nader, who had re-established the former Safavid borders. It was also during this period that he set his sights on the throne, as he believed his campaigns had stabilised the country and brought him enough fame. On 8 March 1736, he was crowned the new shah (king) of Iran, thus abolishing the Safavid dynasty and starting the Afsharid dynasty. Dargah Qoli was killed in 1739 during the Iranian expedition into Jar and Taleh. He was succeeded by his son Mirza Muhammad Khan I, who also continued to work under Nader Shah in the military.

== History ==
Following Nader Shah's assassination in 1747, Iran fell into turmoil, especially in the South Caucasus. There the Georgians and local khans fought over land. The area soon split into multiple semi-autonomous khanates and districts, such as the Baku Khanate. A khanate was a type of administrative unit governed by a hereditary or appointed ruler subject to Iranian rule. The title of the ruler was either beglarbegi or khan, which was identical to the Ottoman rank of pasha. The neighboring khanates were still seen as Iranian dependencies even when the shahs in mainland Iran lacked the power to enforce their rule in the area. It was during this period that Mirza Muhammad Khan I became a vassal of Fath-Ali Khan, the khan of the Quba Khanate. By 1762, the Zand ruler Karim Khan Zand (r. 1751–1779) had established his authority in most of Iran, and was eventually acknowledged by Georgia and the various khans of the South Caucasus as their suzerain.

Map of the Baku Khanate in 1796.

The newly crowned Russian emperor Alexander I (r. 1801–1825) reinstalled Catherine I's previous generals to their former positions, and also chose to resume her plans for the Caucasus. He installed Karl Knorring as the governor of Georgia, and instructed him to offer Russian protection to various khanates (including Baku) that the new shah Fath-Ali Shah had not established his hold over yet. This demonstrates that Alexander, unlike his father, sought to conquer the entire area that was situated between the Aras and Kur rivers. Russian soldiers were now permanently stationed in Tiflis and were prepared to advance to the banks of the Aras. It was crucial to convince the Khan of Baku because his domain included the most important port on the Caspian Sea. Control over the region would make it possible for the Russians to send supplies from Astrakhan directly to the Russian soldiers in Georgia.

The family adopted the name of Badkubeh after relocating to the city of Arak in Iran, whereas a different segment of the family that stayed and worked with the Russians adopted the name Bakikhanov.

== List of khans ==
Monarch	Reign	Relationship to predecessor(s)
Mirza Muhammad Khan I	1735–1768	Son of Dargah Quli Khan.
Fath 'Ali Khan	1768–1770	Khan of Quba; captured Baku.
Abd Allah Beg	1770–1772	Baku was ceded to him by his brother, Fath 'Ali Khan. Khan of Shirvan, 1769–1770.
Malik Muhammad Khan	1772–1783	Son of Mirza Muhammad Khan I; claimed Baku.
Mirza Muhammad Khan II	1783–1791	Son of Malik Muhammad Khan.
Muhammad Quli Khan	1791–1792	Son of Mirza Muhammad Khan I; deposed Mirza Muhammad Khan II.
Husayn Quli Khan	1792–1797	Son of Hadjli Ali Quli, son of Mirza Muhammad Khan I.
Mirza Muhammad Khan II	1797–1801	Son of Malik Muhammad Khan. Regained the Baku Khanate from his nephew, Husayn Quli Khan. Khan of the Baku Khanate, 1809–1810.
Husayn Quli Khan	1801–1806 (1813)	Son of Hadjli Ali Quli, son of Mirza Muhammad Khan I. Regained the Baku Khanate from his nephew, Mirza Muhammad Khan II. Deposed in 1806; officially annexed in 1813.

== Sources ==
- Behrooz, Maziar (2023). Iran at War: Interactions with the Modern World and the Struggle with Imperial Russia. I.B. Tauris. ISBN 978-0755637379.
- Bournoutian, George (1976). The Khanate of Erevan Under Qajar Rule: 1795–1828. University of California. ISBN 978-0939214181.
- Bournoutian, George (1994). A History of Qarabagh: An Annotated Translation of Mirza Jamal Javanshir Qarabaghi's Tarikh-e Qarabagh. Mazda Publishers. ISBN 978-1568590110.
- Bournoutian, George (2016a). The 1820 Russian Survey of the Khanate of Shirvan: A Primary Source on the Demography and Economy of an Iranian Province prior to its Annexation by Russia. Gibb Memorial Trust. ISBN 978-1909724808.
- Bournoutian, George (2016b). "Prelude to War: The Russian Siege and Storming of the Fortress of Ganjeh, 1803–4". Iranian Studies. 50 (1). Taylor & Francis: 107–124. doi:10.1080/00210862.2016.1159779. S2CID 163302882.
- Bournoutian, George (2021). From the Kur to the Aras: A Military History of Russia's Move into the South Caucasus and the First Russo-Iranian War, 1801–1813. Brill. ISBN 978-9004445154.
- Hambly, Gavin R. G. (1991). "Iran during the reigns of Fath 'Alī Shāh and Muhammad Shāh". In Avery, Peter; Hambly, Gavin R. G.; Melville, Charles Peter (eds.). The Cambridge History of Iran: From Nadir Shah to the Islamic Republic. Vol. 7. Cambridge: Cambridge University Press. pp. 144–173. ISBN 0-521-20095-4.
- Tonoyan, Artyom (2019). "On the Caucasian Persian (Tat) Lexical Substratum in the Baku Dialect of Azerbaijani. Preliminary Notes". Zeitschrift der Deutschen Morgenländischen Gesellschaft. 169 (2): 367–378. doi:10.13173/zeitdeutmorggese.169.2.0367. S2CID 211660063.
- Tsutsiev, Arthur (2014). Atlas of the Ethno-Political History of the Caucasus. Yale University Press. ISBN 978-0300153088.
- Tucker, Ernest (2006). "Nāder Shāh". Encyclopaedia Iranica.
