= Zoroastrianism in Azerbaijan =

Overview of the Zoroastrian populace in Azerbaijan

Zoroastrianism in Azerbaijan goes back to the first millennium BC or earlier and was the predominant religion of Greater Iran before the conversion to Islam.

Today the religion, culture, and traditions of Zoroastrianism remain highly respected in Azerbaijan, and the new year Nowruz continues to be one of the main holidays in the country. Zoroastrianism has left a deep mark on the history of Azerbaijan. Traces of the religion are still visible in Surakhany, Khinalyg, and Yanar Dag.

== History ==
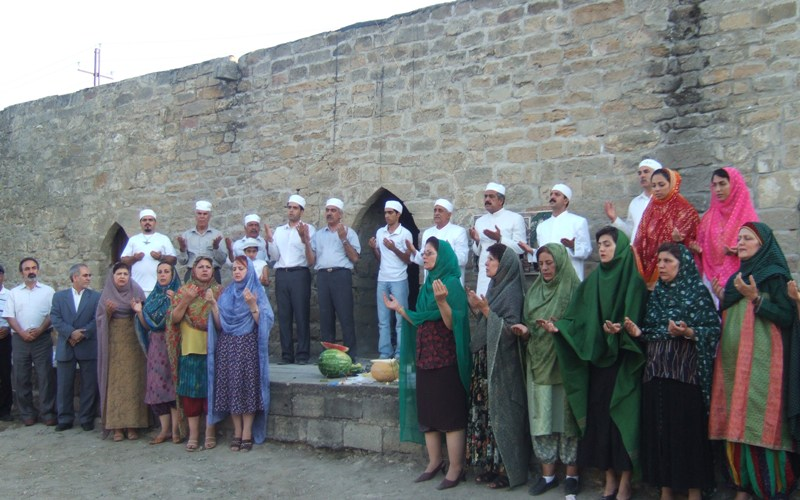
Iranian Zoroastrians praying in Ateshgah of Baku.

One of the world's oldest religions, Zoroastrianism, was also practiced in the territory of Azerbaijan in ancient times. Zoroastrianism, sharing its name with its founder Iranian prophet Zoroaster (also known as Zarathustra), was one of the first monotheistic beliefs in the world and the official religion in Persia from 600 BCE to 650 CE.

Zoroastrians believe in one God, called Ahura Mazda, who created the universe. The Avesta, the sacred book of Zoroastrianism, consists of two main sections: the oldest section contains the Gathas, including seventeen hymns, and the younger Avesta, containing commentaries to the older one. It also includes myths, stories, and details of ritual observances. Fire is the most important symbol of purity in Zoroastrianism. Zoroastrians are wrongly believed to worship fire, but they believe fire represents the symbol of Ahura Mazda.

Regarding the date of birth of Zoroaster, historians mostly agree upon the dates of 660-583 BCE.

Around 550 BCE, Cyrus II integrated the area of southern Azerbaijan into the Achaemenid Empire. During his reign, Zoroastrianism was the dominant religion in the Empire, but he did not make any attempt to impose Zoroastrianism on the people of his subject territories.

During the rule of Darius I, Zoroastrianism was the official religion of the Achaemenid Empire, including Azerbaijan. Darius I also allowed moderate religious freedom in the satrapies.

Alexander the Great defeated Darius III in 331 BCE. During this period, Zoroastrianism began to weaken. Many priests were killed and many sacred texts of Zoroastrianism were destroyed and lost forever.

=== Ancient states in the territory of Azerbaijan ===
==== Adurbadagan (Greek: Atropatena) ====
Around 328 BC, Atropates, the satrap of Media, formed the independent entity of Atropatena. The state was situated in Iranian Azerbaijan, and also included a minor part of the present-day Republic of Azerbaijan (i.e. Arran). As Zoroastrianism was the dominant religion in Atropatena, its capital, Ganzak, became a religious center. Zoroastrian temples were fueled by the region's rich oil deposits. In accordance with many historian sources, the name "Azerbaijan" is attributed to the Persian word for fire "Azar", because of the popularity of Zoroastrianism in the region.

==== Arran (Latin: Albania) ====
In the fourth century BC, in the north of the present-day Republic of Azerbaijan and partially in southern Dagestan, the entity of Caucasian Albania was established. Under Achaemenid, Parthian, and especially Sassanid influence, Zoroastrianism was the dominant religion in the country.

Armenian historian Movses Kaghankatvatsi investigating the political line of Yazdegerd II (438-457) in Albania noted that "During the reign of sinner Yezdeghird, devil instigated him to destroy Christian religion", so he ordered to reject Christianity in Albania and obey fire-worshippers-magicians (Zoroastrianism).

As a result of excavations on the territory of Caucasian Albania, many cultural finds, indicating the spreading of Zoroastrianism in the region, were found.

== Zoroastrian architecture ==
Zoroastrianism's traces can be found in Baku, Shamakha, Nakhchivan, Mingechaur, and the Talysh-Mugan areas. The Absheron Peninsula and Baku were centers of Zoroastrianism in ancient times. The Absheron Peninsula was rich in natural undamped torches of natural gas on the shore and in the sea. In the Sassanid era (3rd-7th centuries), when Zoroastrianism had risen to the level of state religion, Baku entered a new stage in its urban development. The most popular architectural monument of the city is the Maiden Tower (Baku) and ancient city walls and towers that are being preserved as historical monuments that belong to that time.

=== Ateshgah–Baku ===
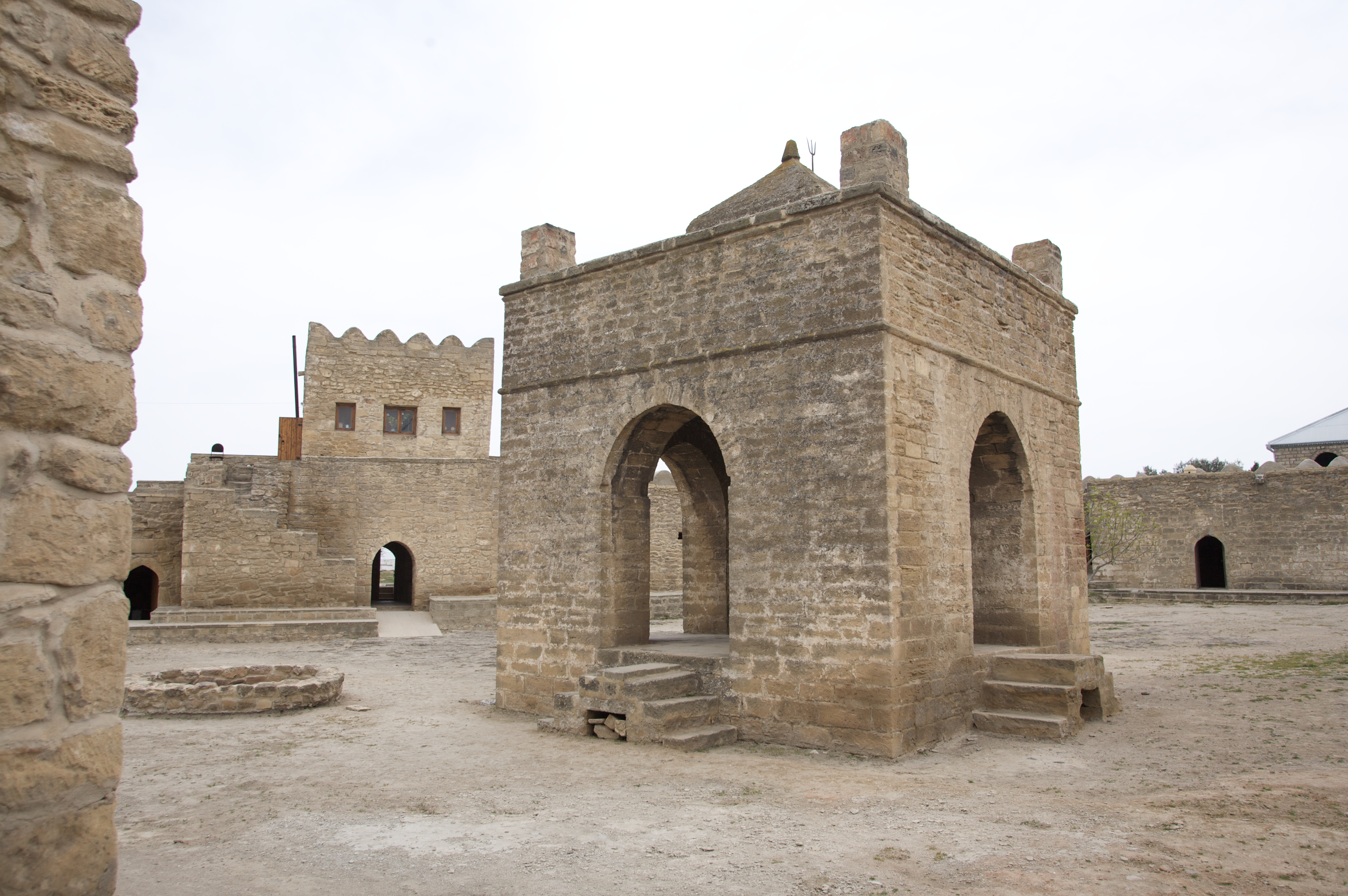
Atashgah Fire Temple

Ateshgah, one of the popular ancient monuments in Azerbaijan dating to the seventeenth century CE is located in the village of Surakhani, 15km east of the capital Baku on the coast of the Caspian Sea. In some sources, this monument is called the fire worshipers' temple. The Ateshgah monument traces its origins to Zoroastrianism, which was the dominant religion in ancient Azerbaijan. Ateshgah temple has been designated as a world heritage site by UNESCO. The temple is not used since 1883 CE.

=== Khinalig ===
The village of Khinalig (Khinalug, Khinalyg) located in the west of the Quba District of Azerbaijan is also famous for its Zoroastrian temples. Burj sanctuary, reflecting Zoroastrian traces was built in the 7th century in the oldest part of Khinalig. There are many caves, pirs ('a holy place' or a 'shrine' in Azerbaijani) around the district.

== Zoroastrianism after Islam arrived in Azerbaijan ==
In the 7th century, the Arabs conquered Persia, including Azerbaijan. During this period, many Zoroastrian temples and libraries were destroyed and burned, and many Zoroastrian texts were lost. Zoroastrians were treated as dhimmis (People of the Book) as well as Jews and Christians by the Arabs. It means that they could retain their religious practices and were protected by the government in exchange for paying the jizya. Despite all the difficulties, Iranians did convert, and Zoroastrianism became a minority religion in Iran.

== Novruz ==
The six Gahambar festivals and Novruz are the seven important Zoroastrian festivals. All Novruz traditions are rooted in Zoroastrianism. These festivals occur at the spring equinox. According to Mary Boyce "It seems a reasonable surmise that Novruz, the holiest of them all, with deep doctrinal significance, was founded by Zoroaster himself".

The Persian historian Gardizi, in his work titled Zayn al-Akhbār, mentions Novruz among Zoroastrian festivals and points out that Zoroaster highly emphasized the celebration of Novruz.

Usually, preparation begins a month prior to Novruz holiday in Azerbaijan. People celebrate the last four Tuesdays prior to the festival being the day of one of the four elements – water, fire, earth, and wind. As a tribute to Zoroastrianism beliefs, every Tuesday during four weeks children jump over small bonfires.

== See also ==
- Fire Temple of Baku
- Ramana, Azerbaijan
- Khinalug
- Gobustan Rayon
- Religion in Azerbaijan
