= Hinduism in Azerbaijan =

Hinduism in Azerbaijan has been tied to cultural diffusion on the Silk Road. One of the remnants of once-dominant Hindu and Buddhist culture in the Caucasus is Surakhani, the site of the Ateshgah of Baku. As of 2020, there were about 500 Hindus in Azerbaijan.

== History ==
In the Middle Ages, Hindu traders visited present-day Azerbaijan for Silk Road trade. The area was traversed by Hindu traders coming mostly from Multan and Sindh (in present-day Pakistan). The Atasghah in Surakhani was used by those traders to worship while in the area. Most of the traders left around the advent of the British Raj. The ceremonies were officiated by a Punjabi pandit. Historical sources indicate that locals worshipped at Surakhani even before the construction of the Atashgah, drawn by the "seven holes with burning flame" from which Surakhani takes its name. In the 1880s, the Czar Alexander III of Russia went to Azerbaijan to witness one of the last Hindu ceremonies performed there. After the 1890s, nearly all of the original Hindu merchants in Azerbaijan had died or left for The Indian Subcontinent.

== Demographics ==
Historical Population
| Year | Pop. | ±% |
|---|---|---|
| 2010 | 276 | — |
| 2020 | 500 | +81.2% |

| Year | Percent | Increase |
|---|---|---|
| 2010 | 0.003% | - |
| 2020 | 0.005% | +0.002% |

== ISKCON ==
Members of the International Society for Krishna Consciousness (ISKCON), also known as the Hare Krishnas, are registered in Baku. In October 2002, authorities returned 20,000 of the 35,000 books seized in 1996 from the Baku Society of Krishna Consciousness Azerbaijan Daily Digest states that very few Azeri people have become Hare Krishna and they are mostly represented by members of ISKCON.

ISKCON has only one community in Azerbaijan, which is in Baku. Religious books of Hare Krishna or of other faiths are frequently seized by the State Customs Committee from travellers entering Azerbaijan through land or sea borders. Seizures also sometimes occur at Baku airport. Although Azerbaijan constitution protects religion freedom, there is a de facto ban on people exercising religions like Baha’is, Hare Krishna devotees etc.

== See also ==
- Hinduism by country
- Religion in Azerbaijan
- Hinduism in Armenia
