= Suraxanı (town) =

Town in Azerbaijan

Coordinates: 40°23′11″N 50°01′22″E

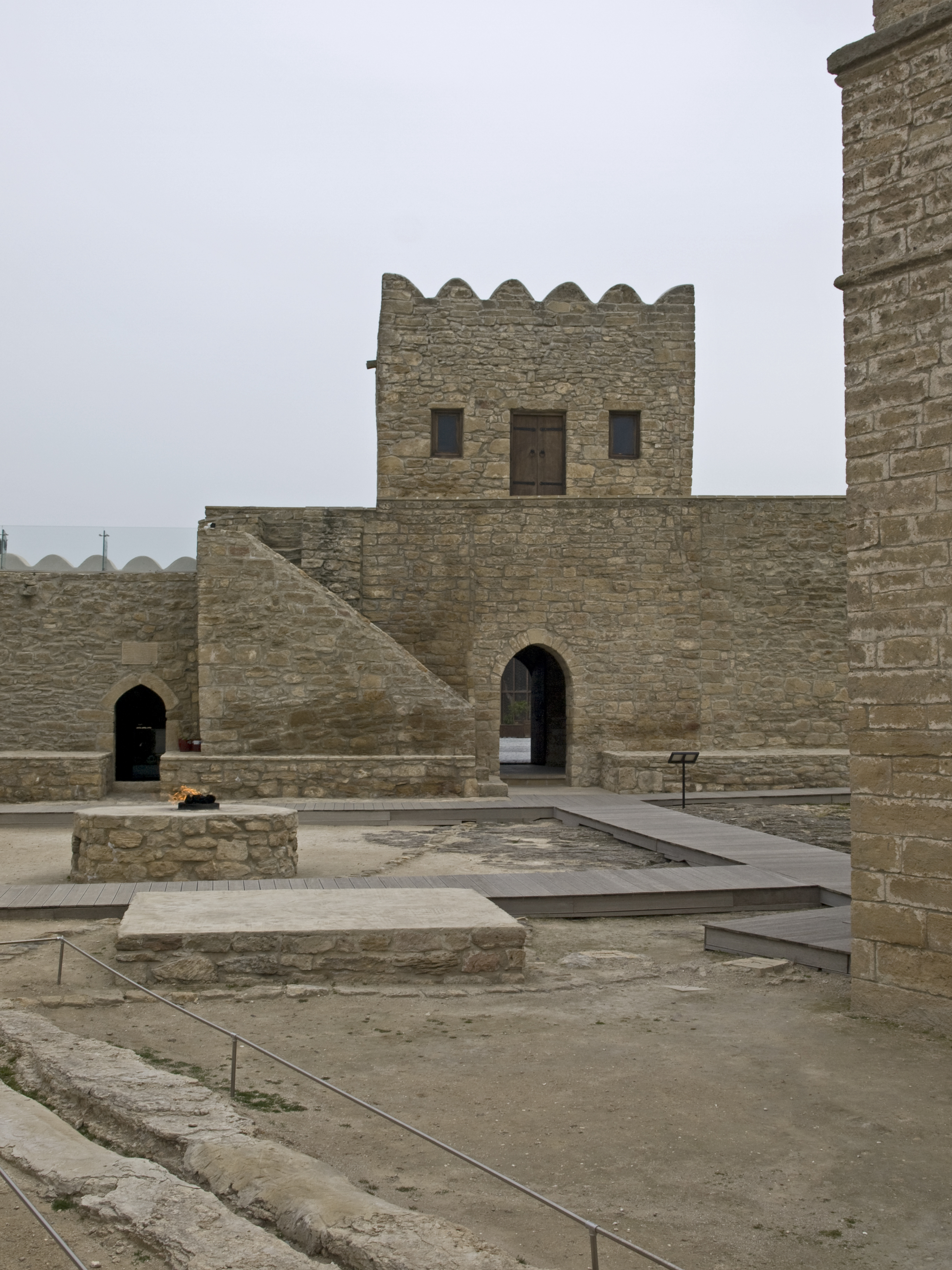
Ateshgah of Baku

Suraxanı or Surakhany (Azerbaijani: Suraxanı) is a town in the eastern part of Azerbaijan, administrative center of Suraxanı raion of Baku agglomeration. It is located in the Absheron peninsula, at an altitude of 12 meters above sea level, 30 km to the north-east from Baku.

A name of the city is translated as “warm house” from the Tat language. From times immemorial outskirts of Suraxanı were famed for abundance of oil wells. The first oil refinery in the world was built in Suraxanı on the initiative of Vasily Kokorev, in 1857. Dmitri Mendeleev worked in this refinery as a consultant. In 1879, Baku-Sabunchu railway branch, which significantly facilitated transportation of oil, passed through Suraxanı and in 1926, the first line of electric trains in the USSR passed through Suraxanı.

== Sightseeing ==
- Ateshgah temple
