= Məmmədli, Absheron =

Məhəmmədi
- Municipality
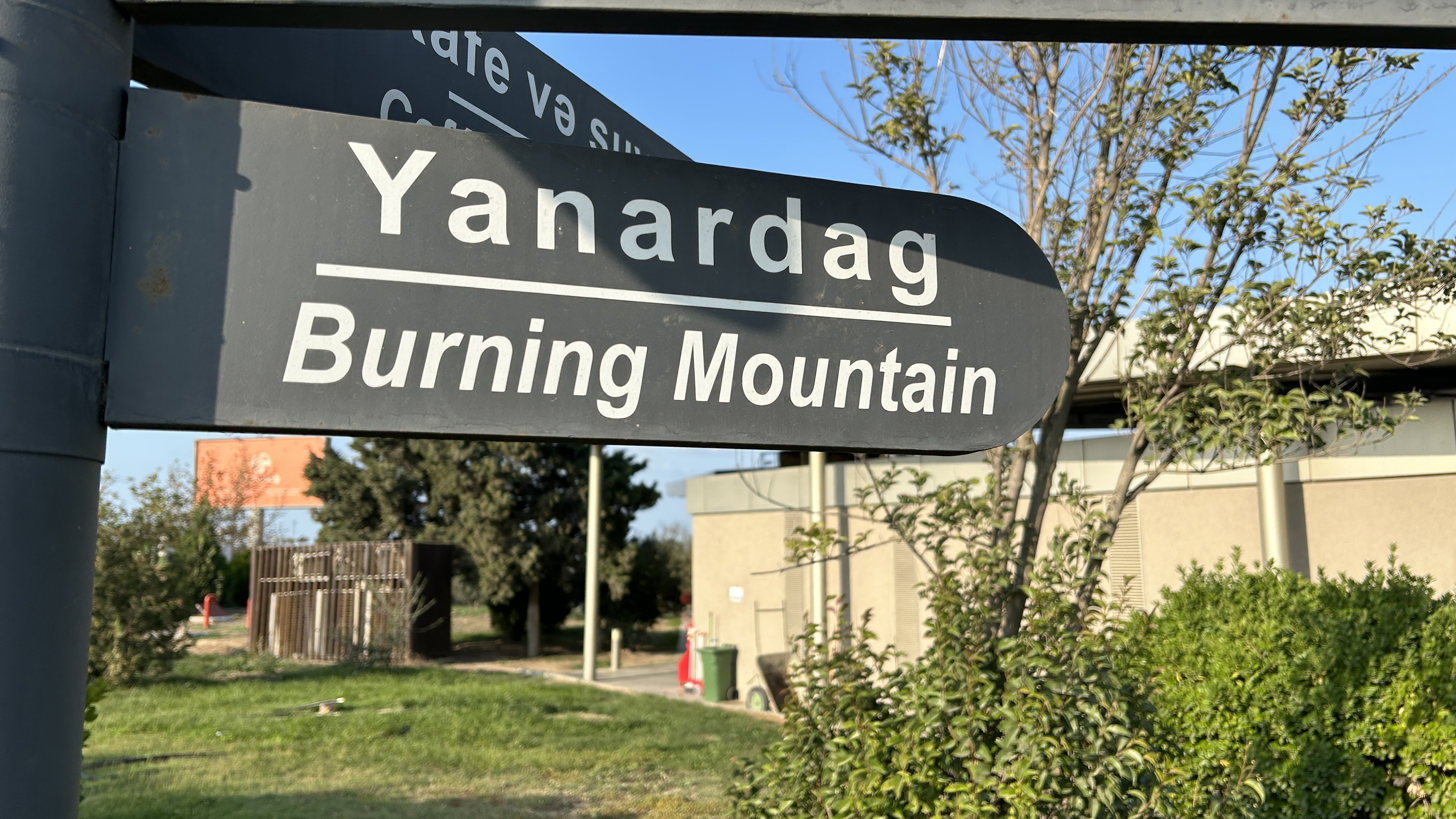
- Yanardag sign in Mammadli

- Location within Azerbaijan
- Coordinates: 40°30′19″N 49°54′06″E
- Country: Azerbaijan
- District: Absheron

Population
  - Total: 2,758
- Time zone: UTC+4 (AZT)
  - Summer (DST): UTC+5 (AZT)

Məhəmmədi (also, Falmay-Mahomedly, Magamedly, Magomedli, Magomedly, Mamedi, and Mamedli) is a village and municipality in the Absheron Rayon of Azerbaijan. It has a population of 2,758.

== Transportation ==
Baku suburban railway
