= Yanar Dagh =

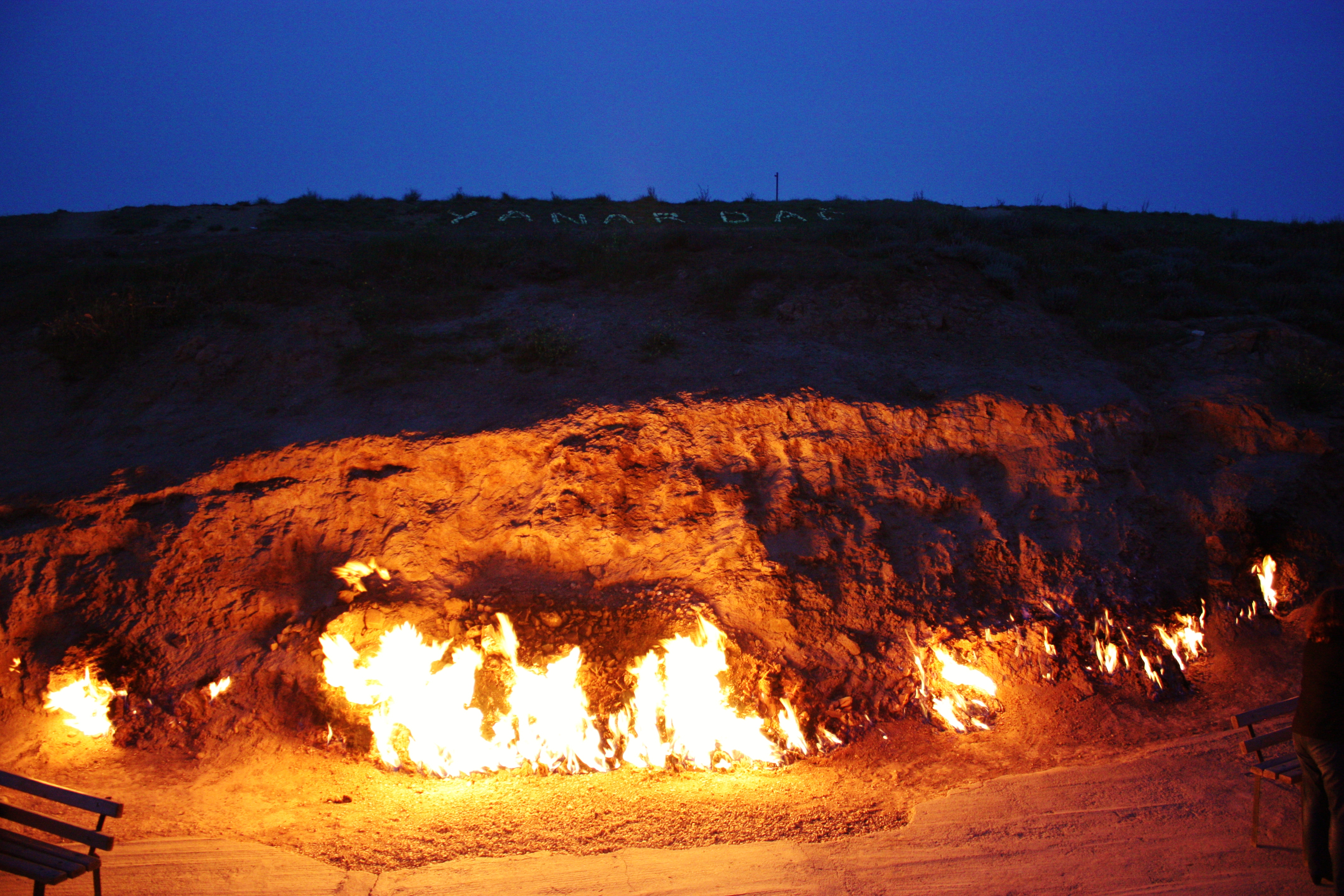
- Yanar Dagh at night

- Location within Azerbaijan
- Coordinates: 40°30′6.6″N 49°53′28.51″E
- Country: Azerbaijan

Yanar Dagh (Azerbaijani: Yanar Dağ, lit. 'burning mountain') is a natural gas fire that burns perpetually on a hillside on the Absheron Peninsula near Baku, the capital of Azerbaijan, a country known as "the Land of Fire". Flames rise up to 3 metres (9.8 ft) from a thin, porous layer of sandstone.

The Yanar Dagh flame burns steadily, fueled by a continuous seep of gas from beneath the surface. Unlike the nearby mud volcanoes of Lokbatan or Gobustan, there is no mud or liquid discharge at Yanar Dagh.

Administratively, Yanar Dagh is part of the Absheron District of Azerbaijan. The State Historical-Cultural and Natural Reserve was established on the site by presidential decree on May 2, 2007, and is managed by the State Tourism Agency of the Republic of Azerbaijan. Following a major renovation between 2017 and 2019, the Yanar Dagh Museum and the Cromlech Stone Exhibition were opened within the Reserve.

== History ==
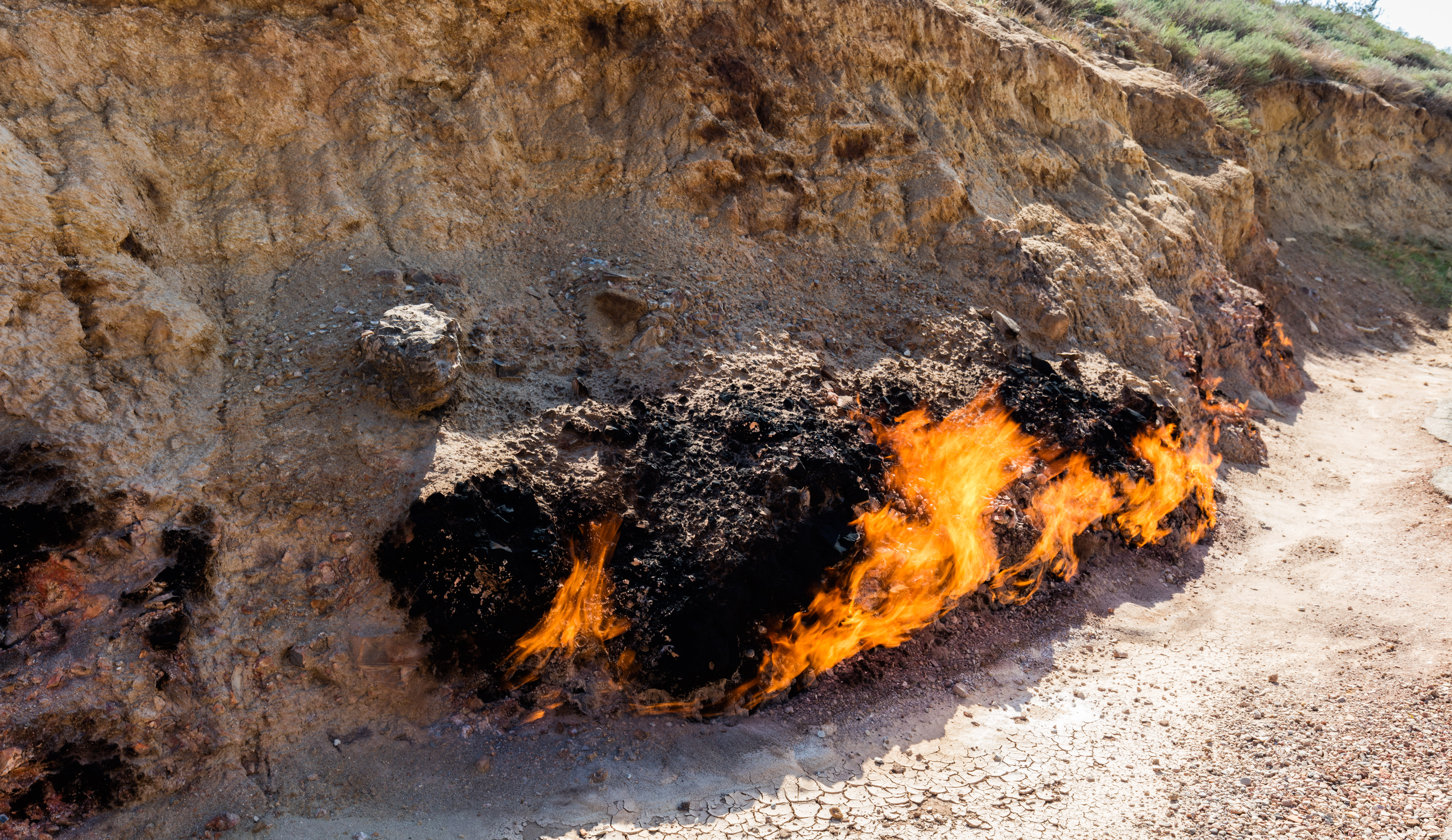
View of Yanar Dagh on the road side hill

Since the first millennium BCE, the fire served as a link between humans and supernatural powers in the Zoroastrian religion.

The high concentration of natural gas beneath the Absheron Peninsula has sustained natural flames throughout history, which were documented by historical figures such as Marco Polo. Once common in Azerbaijan, only a few natural fires remain today, with Yanar Dagh being the most notable example.

Besides Yanar Dagh, the most well-known site of a similar natural fire is the Fire Temple near Baku, located on the outskirts of the Greater Caucasus. This religious site, known as an Ateshgah, meaning "temple of fire", holds historical significance in fire-worship traditions. Similar to the flames of Yanar Dagh, the fire at the Ateshgah of Baku was originally a natural phenomenon resulting from the seepage of natural gas through porous strata. However, the natural gas flow at Ateshgah ceased some time ago, and the flames now visible there are sustained by a gas main, while the flames at Yanar Dagh continue to burn naturally.

According to some local accounts, the Yanar Dagh flame was only discovered in the 1950s when it was accidentally ignited by a shepherd, while others maintain that the fire has burned for 4,000 years.

== Natural gas fires ==
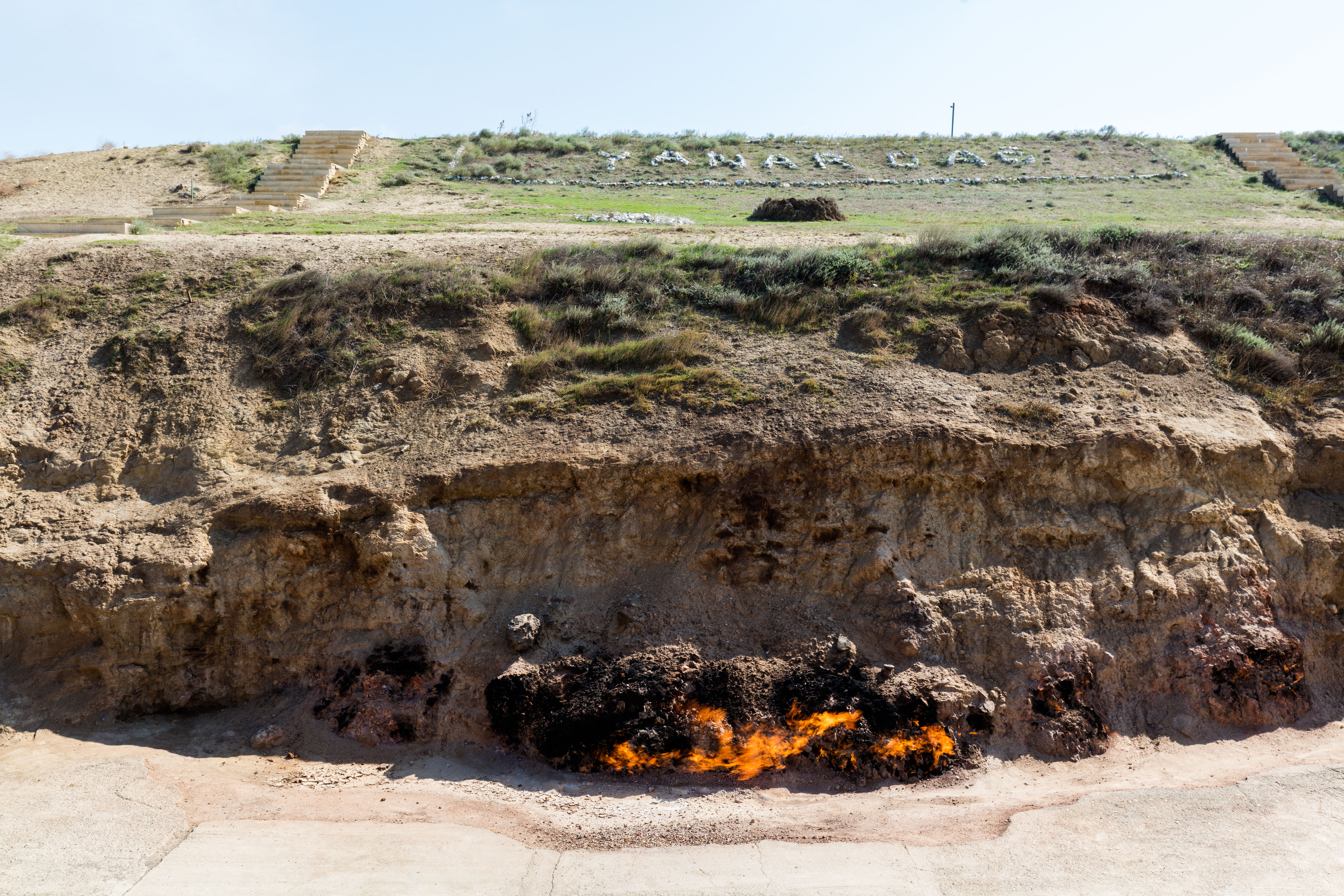
Yanar Dagh view by the road side

The Yanar Dagh fires are caused by the emission of hydrocarbon gases from subsurface layers of the Earth.

The flames emanate from vents in sandstone formations, reaching heights of up to 3 metres (9.8 ft) at the base of a 10-metre-wide (33 ft) scarp below a hillside, although other sources cite varying figures. Yanar Dagh is described by the Geological Survey of Azerbaijan as "Intensive flames, to 1 metre (3 ft 3 in) high, develop for 15 metres (49 ft) along the base of a 2–4-metre-high (6.6–13.1 ft) and 200-metre-long (660 ft) tectonic scarp." It has also been suggested that such fires may contribute to thermal metamorphism.

A study conducted by geologists from the Geological Survey of Azerbaijan analyzed four samples collected from Yanar Dagh. The results revealed that the area of maximum flux was located at the upper side of the fault scarp, precisely where the flames originate. The value of microseepage recorded was in the range of 10^{3} mg m^{−2} d^{−1} at approximately 30 metres (~100 ft) from the fire, on the upper part of the study area. It has been inferred that the degassing area extends beyond the measured zone, with microseepage likely occurring pervasively along the fault line. This fault scarp is believed to be part of the extensive Balakhany-Fatmai structural formation on the Absheron Peninsula.

== State reserve ==
In order to protect this landmark and boost tourism in the region, the Yanardagh State Historical, Cultural, and Natural Reserve was established by presidential decree on May 2, 2007. Operating under the State Tourism Agency, the reserve is located in the village of Mammadli. Following extensive renovations between 2017 and 2019, the Yanardagh Museum and Yanardagh Cromlech Stone Exhibition were opened within the reserve. Spanning 64.55 hectares, the site includes a 500-seat amphitheater for outdoor concerts. The reserve also features a three-zone museum showcasing ancient stones and local craftsmanship, along with tombstones, ancient kurgans, and two burial grounds containing historic graves.

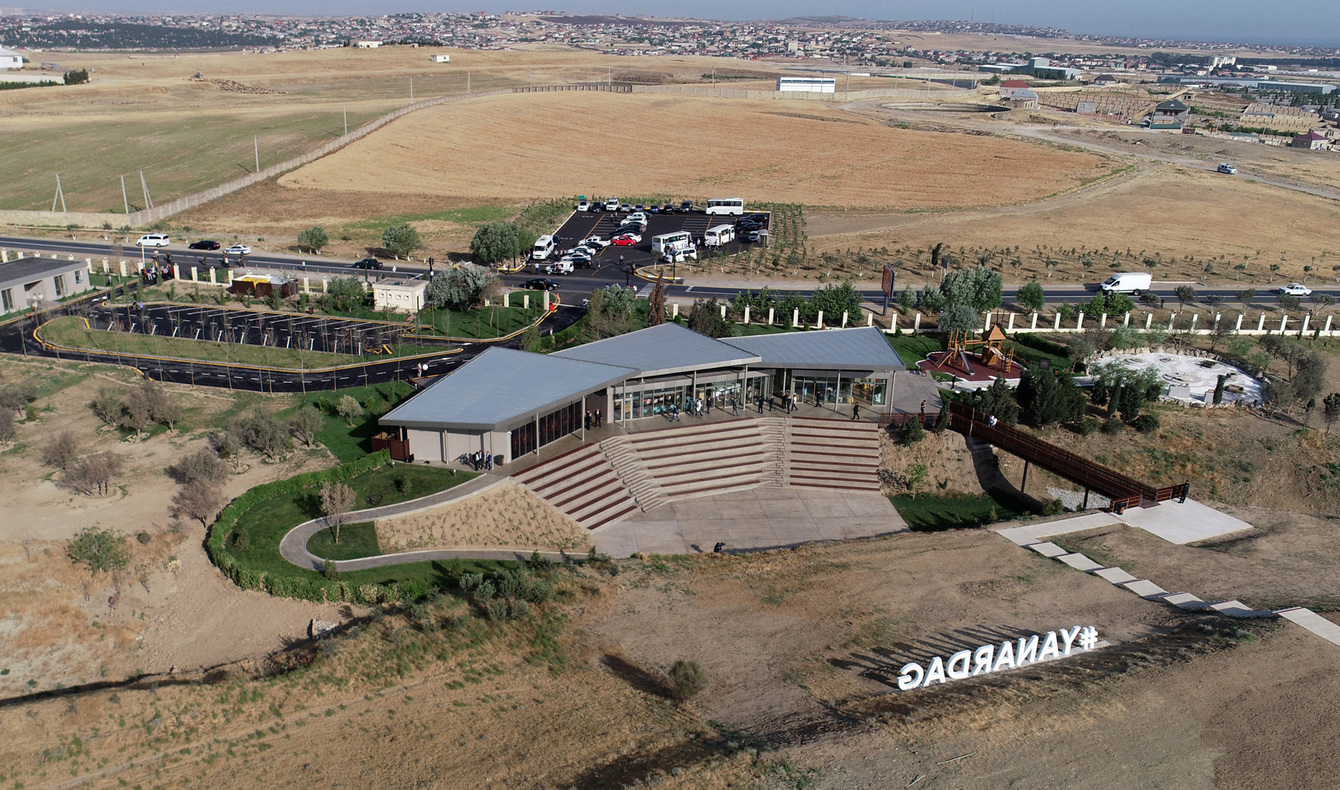
Yanardagh State Historical, Cultural and Natural Reserve

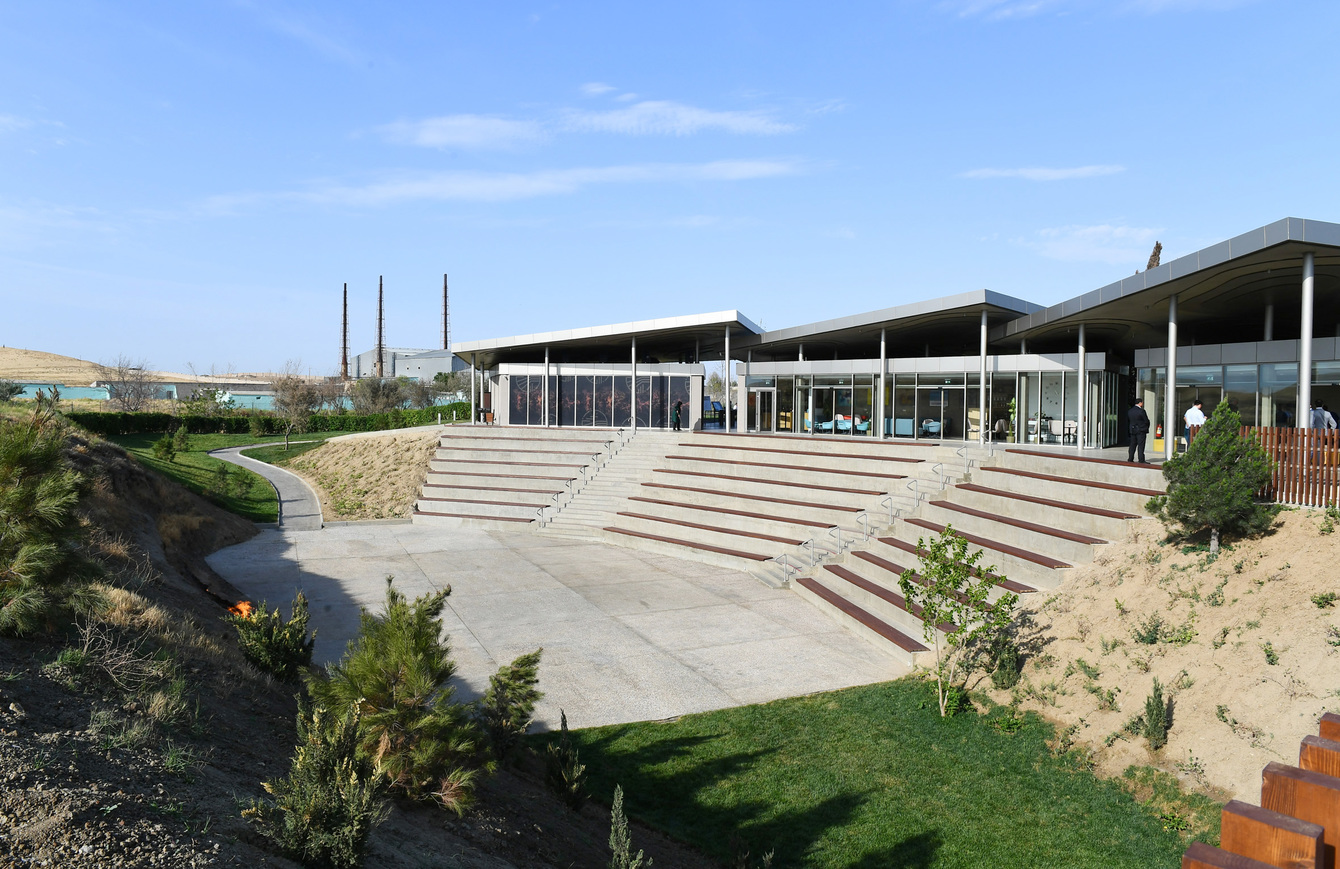
Yanardagh Reserve

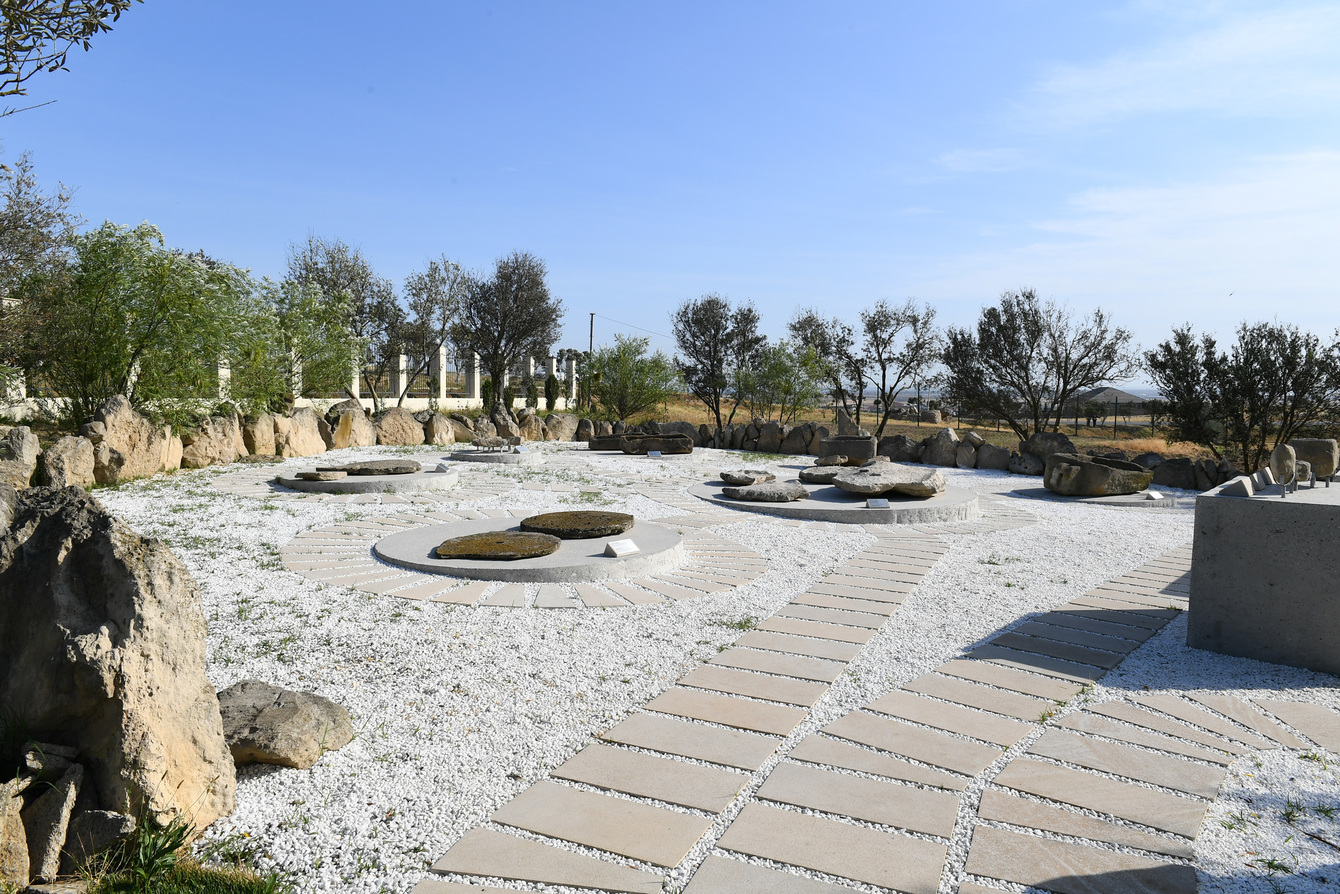
Yanardagh Cromlech Stone Exhibition

== See also ==
- Zoroastrianism in Azerbaijan
- Ramana, Azerbaijan
- Khinalug
- Darvaza gas crater
- Yanartaş
- Burning Mountain
