= Suraxanı raion =

Surakhany
- Raion
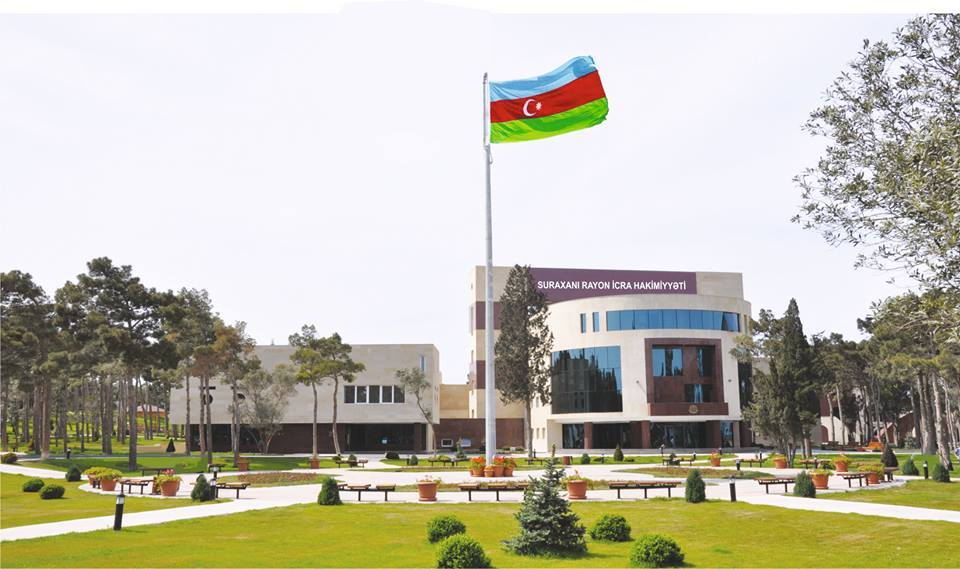
- Surakhani district executive authority building

- Location within Azerbaijan
- Coordinates: 40°25′13″N 50°00′17″E
- Country: Azerbaijan
- City: Baku

Population
  - Total: 210,500
- Time zone: UTC+4 (AZT)

Suraxanı (Surakhany) is a settlement and raion of Baku, Azerbaijan. It has a population of 210,500.

The region is best known for the Fire Temple of Baku on the northern edge of town, a castle-like temple and monastery complex known locally as the Ateşgah or Ateshgyakh. It was a Zoroastrian temple. The complex was built on a pocket of natural gas that once produced a flame from natural gas seepage.

The local Tat name of the raion is said to related to "the Persian words 'Surakh' (hole) or Surkh/ Sorkh (red) and 'khani' (source or fountain). According to historical sources, before the construction of the Parsi Temple Of Fire (Atashgah) in Surakhany at the end of the 18th century, the local people also worshipped at this site because of the 'seven holes with burning flame'. And thus the name 'Surakhany' – holes with burning fountains."

The township itself is poor and surrounded by the petrochemical industry facilities that are endemic to the Absheron Peninsula.

== Gallery ==
Newly-built school complex 87 in Surakhani district, Baku

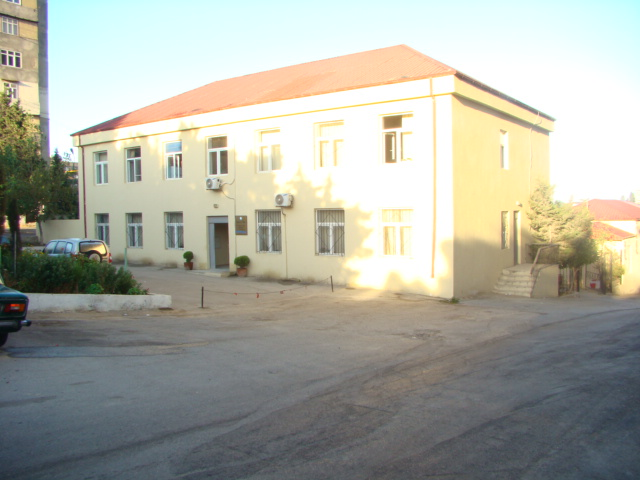
Azərsu – Water Company

== Notable natives ==
Aygün Beyler – Azerbaijani actress and singer
