= Ovando =

Ovando is a surname. Notable people with the surname include:

- Alfredo Ovando Candía (1918–1982), Bolivian general, president and dictator
- Clementina Díaz y de Ovando (1916–2012), Mexican writer and researcher
- Diego de Cáceres y Ovando, Spanish nobleman
- Diego Fernández de Ovando, Spanish military and nobleman
- Diego Fernández de Cáceres y Ovando (died after 1487), Spanish military and nobleman
- Eduardo Ovando Martínez (born 1955), Mexican politician
- Fernando Alfón de Ovando, Spanish military and nobleman
- Fernando Fernández de Ovando, Spanish diplomat and nobleman
- Francisco José de Ovando, 1st Marquis of Brindisi (c. 1693–1755), Spanish soldier and governor of Chile
- Hernán Pérez de Ovando, Spanish military man and nobleman
- Janette Ovando (born 1977), Mexican politician
- Javier Ovando (born c. 1977), Honduran immigrant framed by the LAPD
- José Luis Ovando Patrón (born 1970), Mexican politician
- Marcos Ramírez de Prado y Ovando (1592–1667), Spanish Roman Catholic prelate
- Neriman Ovando (born 1991), Dominican footballer
- Nicolás de Ovando (1460–1511), Spanish soldier and governor of the Indies
- Sancho Fernández de Ovando, Spanish nobleman
