= Nariman =

Nariman (also spelled Narriman, Nareeman, Neriman, Nəriman) is a given name and surname of Persian origin (Persian: نریمان Narīmān). It has roots traced to the Persian epic, Shahnameh, written by Ferdowsi. The name can mean "faith and brightness". It can also mean "brave, hero", with roots in the Avestan word naire-manå ("brave, manly"). In other countries, like Iran, it is used interchangeably with Nauroz, the Persian festival. In Iran and Azerbaijan it is typically a masculine given name. Notable people with the name include:

== Given name ==
=== Nariman ===
- Nariman Akhundzade (born 2004), Azerbaijani footballer
- Nariman Aliev (born 1992), Ukrainian director and screenwriter
- Nariman Aly (born 1998), Egyptian synchronised swimmer
- Nariman Ataev (1971–2007), Uzbek boxer
- Nariman Azimov (1936–2016), Azerbaijani conductor and composer
- Nariman Battikha (born 1995), Venezuelan beauty pageant titleholder
- Nariman Behravesh (born 1948), American economist
- Nariman Dzhelyal (born 1980), Ukrainian diplomat
- Nariman Farvardin (born 1956), American engineer
- Nariman Gusalov (born 1990), Russian footballer
- Nariman Hasanzade (1931–2026), Azerbaijani poet and playwright
- Nariman Irani (died 1977), Indian cinematographer and film producer
- Nariman Isayev (1930–1988), Azerbaijani-Soviet engineer and statesman
- Nariman Israpilov (born 1988), Russian freestyle wrestler
- Nariman Kurbanov (born 1997), Kazakh artistic gymnast
- Nariman Mammadov (born 1969), Azerbaijani film producer
- Nariman Mammadov (composer) (1928–2015), Azerbaijani composer and professor
- Nariman Marshall (1905–1979), Indian cricketer
- Nariman Mehta (1920–2014), Indian-American organic chemist and pharmacologist
- Nariman Miftyayev (born 1991), Russian footballer
- Nariman bey Narimanbeyov (1889–1937), Azerbaijani lawyer and statesman
- Nariman Narimanov (1870–1925), Azerbaijani statesman, revolutionary, and writer
- Nariman Printer, Indian amateur radio operator
- Nariman Khan Qavam al-Saltaneh (1830–??), Iranian politician
- Nariman Tuleyev, Kyrgyz railway developer and politician
- Nariman Turegaliyev (born 1964), Kazakh lawyer and politician
- Nariman Youssef (born 1975), Egyptian translator and writer

=== Narriman ===
- Narriman Sadek (1933–2005), Egyptian queen

=== Neriman ===
- Neriman Cahit (1937–2025), Turkish Cypriot poet and author
- Neriman Elgin (1921–1994), Turkish politician
- Neriman Köksal (1928–1999), Turkish actress
- Neriman Ovando (born 1991), Dominican footballer
- Neriman Özsoy (born 1988), Turkish volleyball player

== Surname ==
- Fali Nariman (1929–2024), Indian jurist
- Khurshed Nariman (1883–1948), Indian politician
- Mansour Nariman (1935–2015), Iranian musician

== Fictional characters ==
- Narreeman, character in Flashman
- Nariman Hansotia, character in Squatter, a story in Tales from Firozsha Baag by Rohinton Mistry

== Places ==
- Nariman, Ardabil, Iran
- Nariman, Lorestan, Iran
- Nariman, Zanjan, Iran
- Nariman, Kyrgyzstan
- Nariman, Republic of Dagestan, Russia
- Nariman Point, Mumbai, India
- Narimanovo Airport, Astrakhan, Russia
- Nərimanov raion, Baku, Azerbaijan
- Nərimanov, Azerbaijan

== Other uses ==
- Nariman (film), a 2001 Indian Malayalam action/investigative thriller

== See also ==
- Nərimanabad (disambiguation), various places in Azerbaijan
- Nərimanlı (disambiguation), various places in Azerbaijan
- Nərimankənd (disambiguation), various places in Azerbaijan
