= Nərimankənd =

Nərimankənd or Narimankend may refer to:

- Nərimankənd, Bilasuvar, Azerbaijan
- Nərimankənd, Gadabay, Azerbaijan
- Nərimankənd, Gobustan, Azerbaijan
- Nərimankənd, Sabirabad, Azerbaijan
- Qoşakənd, Azerbaijan
