= Diego Fernández =

Diego Fernández may refer to:

- Diego Fernández of Oviedo (fl. 1020–c. 1046), Count of Asturias and father of Jimena Díaz, the wife of Rodrigo Díaz de Vivar, el Cid
- Diego Fernández de Ovando, Spanish military and nobleman, knight of the Order of Alcántara in 1338
- Diego Fernández de la Cueva, 1st Viscount of Huelma (died 1473), Spanish nobleman
- Diego Fernández de Córdoba y Arellano, 1st Marquis of Comares (1463–1518), Governor of Oran and Mazalquivir and Viceroy of Navarre,
- Diego Fernández de Palencia (c. 1520–c. 1581), Spanish adventurer and historian
- Diego Fernández de Proaño, Spanish explorer and conquistador
- Diego Fernández de Cáceres y Ovando (died 1487), Spanish military and nobleman
- Diego Fernández de Córdoba, 1st Marquess of Guadalcázar (1578–1630), Viceroy of Mexico, 1612–1621, and Viceroy of Peru, 1622–1629
- Diego Fernández de Medrano y Zenizeros (fl. C.17th), Spanish cleric, nobleman, and author
- Diego Fernández (harpsichord maker) (1703–1775), harpsichord maker of the Spanish court
- Diego Fernández de Cevallos (born 1941), Mexican politician affiliated to the conservative National Action Party
- Diego Fernández (director), Uruguayan director of the 2021 film The Broken Glass Theory
- Diego Fernández (footballer) (born 1988), Chilean footballer

== See also ==
- Diogo Fernandes (disambiguation)
