= Sé (Bragança) =

- Civil parish
- Location in Portugal
- Coordinates: 41.811°N 6.766°W
- Country: Portugal
- Region: Norte
- Intermunic. comm.: Terras de Trás-os-Montes
- District: Bragança
- Municipality: Bragança
- Disbanded: 2013

Area
  - Total: 10.72 km^{2} (4.14 sq mi)

Population (2001)
  - Total: 17,913
  - Density: 1,671/km^{2} (4,328/sq mi)
- Time zone: UTC+00:00 (WET)
  - Summer (DST): UTC+01:00 (WEST)
- Website: http://www.braganca-se.com.pt/

Sé is a former civil parish in the municipality of Bragança, Portugal. In 2013, the parish merged into the new parish Sé, Santa Maria e Meixedo. The population in 2011 was 17,913, in an area of 10.72 km^{2}.

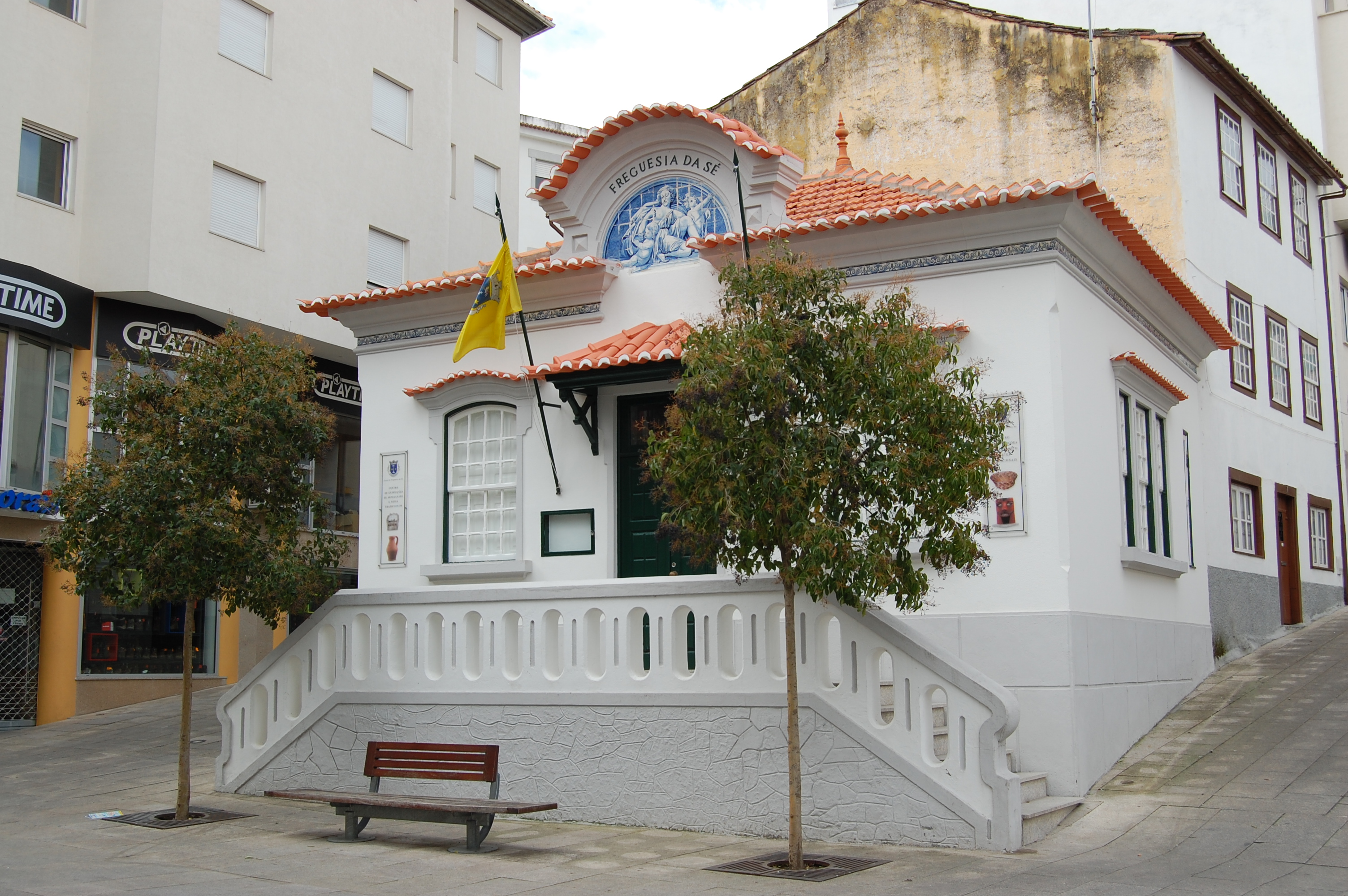
Old building of the Junta de Freguesia.

== Heritage ==
- Bragança Castle
- Pelourinho de Bragança
- Domus Municipalis
- Bragança Regional Hospital and Mental Health Center
- Igreja Paroquial de São João Baptista or Igreja da Sé or Igreja dos Jesuítas
