= Pillory of Bragança =

- Pelourinho de Bragança
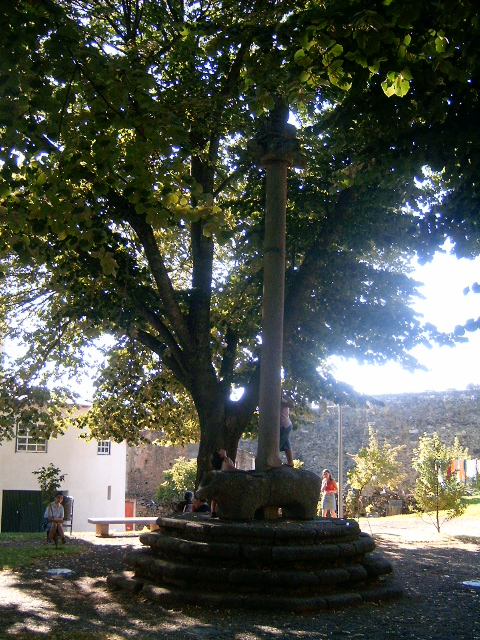
- The pillory, as it is located in the Praça do Santiago
- Interactive map of the Pillory of Bragança area

General information
- Type: Pillory
- Architectural style: Manueline
- Location: Sé, Santa Maria e Meixedo, Bragança, Portugal
- Coordinates: 41°48′15″N 6°44′59″W
- Owner: Portuguese Republic

Technical details
- Material: Granite

The Pillory of Bragança (Portuguese: Pelourinho de Bragança) is a 15th-century sculpted stone column with symbolic political, administrative and judicial significance, erected over a four-step octagonal platform, located in the civil parish of Sé, Santa Maria e Meixedo, municipality of Bragança. It consists of a cylindrical column erected over a square platform, sculpted with zoomorphic symbols, anthropomorphic scenes and the shield of the city of Bragança. Its structural design and sculptural ornamentation is characteristics of the era; the column is classified as a National Monument since 1910.

== History ==
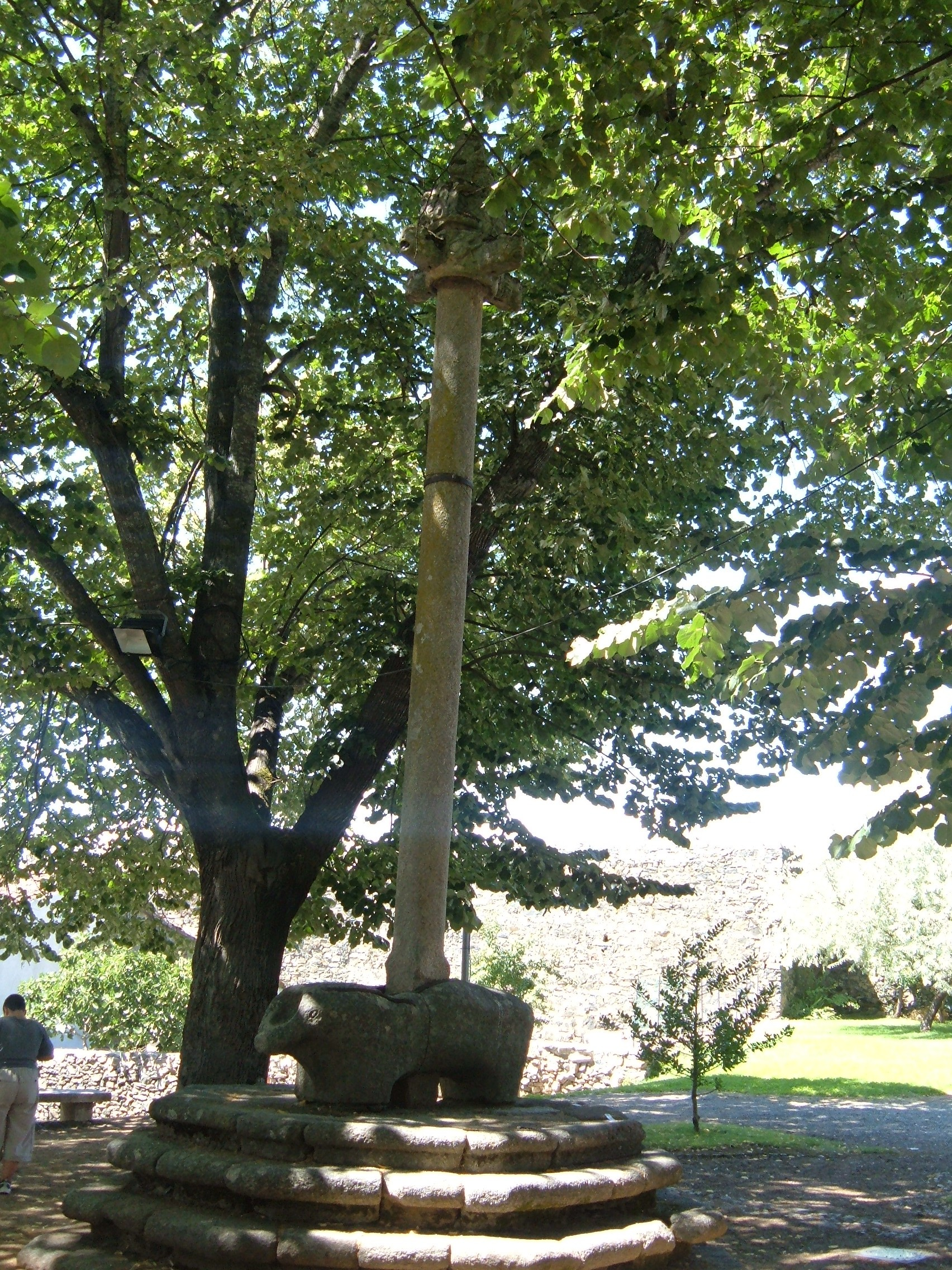
The pillory of Bragança

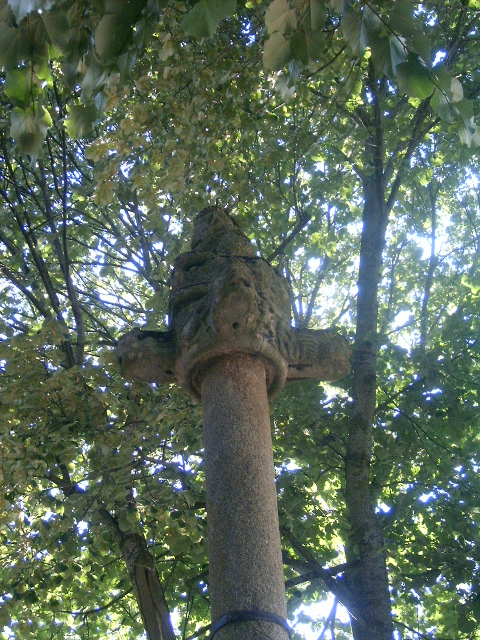
The top of the pillory, with zoomorphic sculptures

The pillory was erected in 500 A.D. In 1187, D. Sancho I conceded the municipality's foral, ordering the reconstruction of the pillory, while promoting the region's growth. In 1219, Afonso II confirmed the municipal charter established by his predecessor which was later extended by D. Afonso III on 20 May 1253.

The first fair conceded to the region occurred on 15 July 1455: for a period of 16 days, allowing merchants and vendors to sell goods at the site. Bragança's growth was progressive and cumulative, finally resulting in its reclassification as city on 20 February 1464, by Afonso V.

The pillory's politico-administrative and judicial importance was made obvious in 1507. Owing to the nuisance resulting from the custom of exhibiting the severed body parts of sentenced peasants on the pillory, D. Manual ordered that these artifacts be moved to another area of the town. As was noted: "it was near the settlement and did very great damage because the square was very small and the pillory was near the main door of the church...and so near the door of the fortress". As noted, D. Manuel ordered that the hands, feet, ears and severed heads of the convicted should be moved to the archway gate of São Bendito, which was the old city gate, along the main road.

On 11 November 1514, D. Manuel, ordered the construction of a new pillory to the newly conceded foral, when the monarch conceded its inhabitants the privilege of not suffering the pillory for delinquency in the village.

Father Carvalho da Costa referred to the pillory along the square in 1706, when writing a description of the square and the old municipal hall (the Domus Municipalis). By this time the comarca had transferred to the titleholders of the House of Bragança, who were also held dominion of the lands of the province. They were responsible for establishing many of the socio-judicial institutions, resulting in an expansion of the local authority, that includes judges, magistrates, procurators, secretaries, aldermen and other judicial appointments ordered by the Crown.

Bishop Frair Aleixo de Miranda Henriques transferred the bishopric of Miranda do Douro (1545) to Bragança in 1764.

Just after the mid-century, in 1860 the pillory was removed from its old square and moved to the Praça de Santiago. In 1873, Bragança was divided in two: the older quarter became the town of Bragança, while the other evolved into the city of Bragança.

== Architecture ==
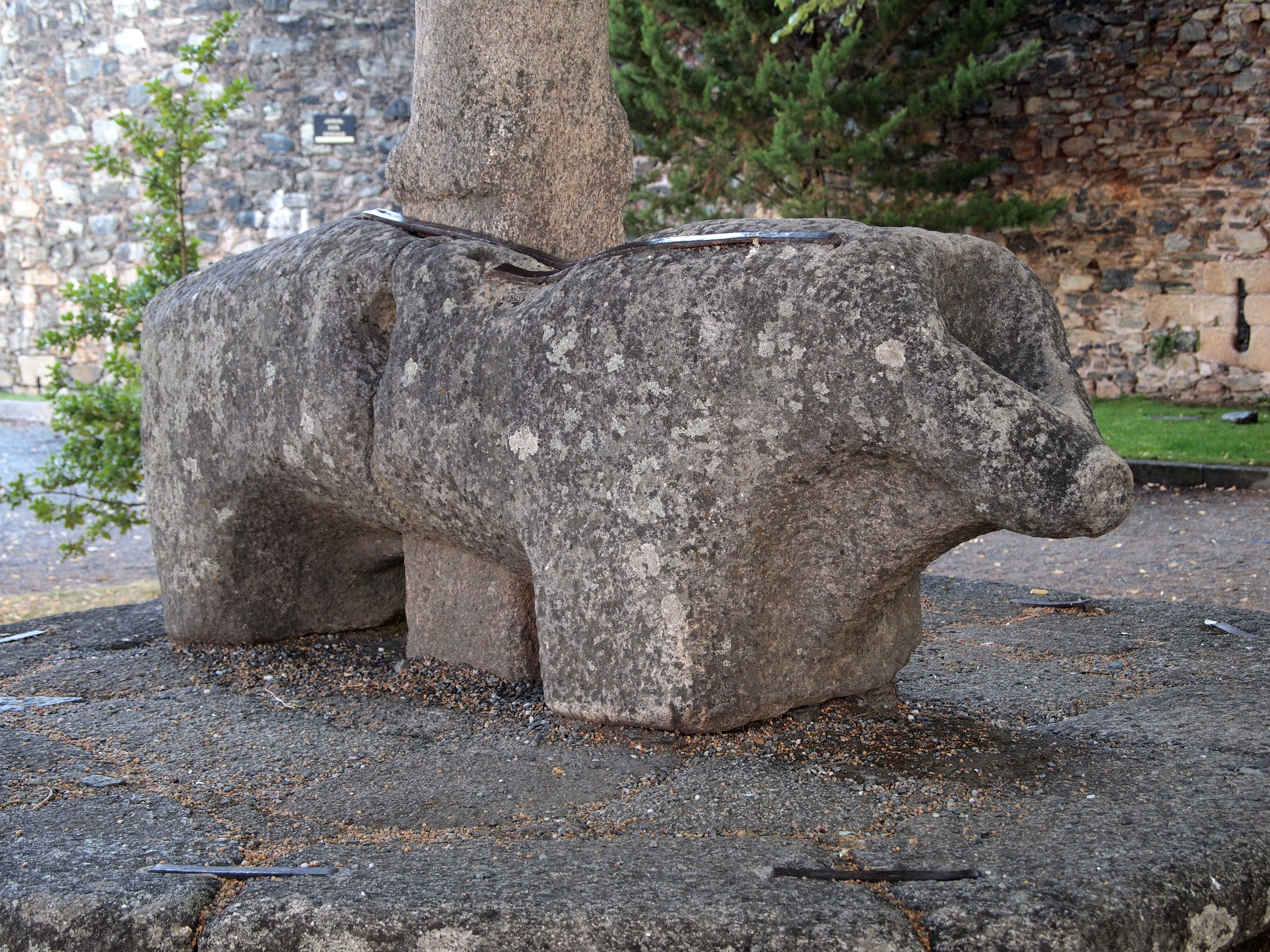
The pig-like base of the pillory

The structure is located within an isolated area of the urbanized area of Sé, Santa Maria e Meixedo, in a square within the Castle of Bragança (PT010402420003), near the keep tower, occupying an area where the old Church of São Pedro was located, opposite an area of village homes.

The pillory is unique, owing to its base, resembling a proto-historic, Lusitanian bore carved in a rough, stocky appearance, that includes short legs.

The main shaft is crossed by four arms, that are sculpted in zoomorphic images, where rings were fixed to hold the prisoners, still preserving their holes. Between each arm are zoomorphic or anthropomorphic representations, leading Louis Key to include this example in the pillories featuring mythological scenes or punishment. Although the establishment of the pillory dated to the 13th century, this representation is actually from the 16th century, when the final charter from D. Manuel as established.
