= Meixedo =

Meixedo may refer to the following places in Portugal:

- Meixedo (Bragança), a former parish in Bragança
- Meixedo e Padornelos, a parish in Montalegre
- Meixedo (Viana do Castelo), a parish in Viana do Castelo
