= David Pérez =

David Pérez may refer to:

- David Pérez Arteaga (born 1981), Spanish footballer
- David Pérez (football manager) (born 1982), Spanish football manager
- David Pérez Ibáñez (born 1960), Spanish politician
- David Pérez Sañudo (born 1987), Spanish screenwriter and director, The Last Romantics et al.
- David Pérez Sanz (born 1994), Spanish tennis player
- David Pérez (Spanish politician) (born 1972), Spanish politician
- David Perez (Swedish politician) (born 1990), Swedish politician
- David Pérez Tejada (born 1979), Mexican politician
- David Pérez, American singer, member of C-Note

== See also ==
- Davide Perez (1711–1778), Italian composer
