= Nərimanlı =

Nərimanlı may refer to:

- Nərimanlı, Goranboy, Azerbaijan
- Nərimanlı, Shamkir, Azerbaijan
- Shatvan, formerly Nərimanlı, Gegharkunik Province, Armenia
