= Hernán Pérez =

Hernán Pérez may refer to:

- Hernán Pérez de Ovando (fl. 1229), Spanish military man and nobleman
- Hernán Pérez de Quesada(1515-1544), Spanish conquistador in Colombia, Peru and Ecuador
- Hernán Pérez (footballer, born 1981), Spanish football manager and former midfielder
- Hernán Pérez (footballer, born 1989), Paraguayan football winger
- Hernán Pérez (baseball) (born 1991), Venezuelan baseball player

== See also ==
- Hernán-Pérez, a municipality in Spain
