= Skobelev Brothers' Mill =

Mill built in 1903–1909 in Baku

- Skobelev qardaşlarının dəyirmanı
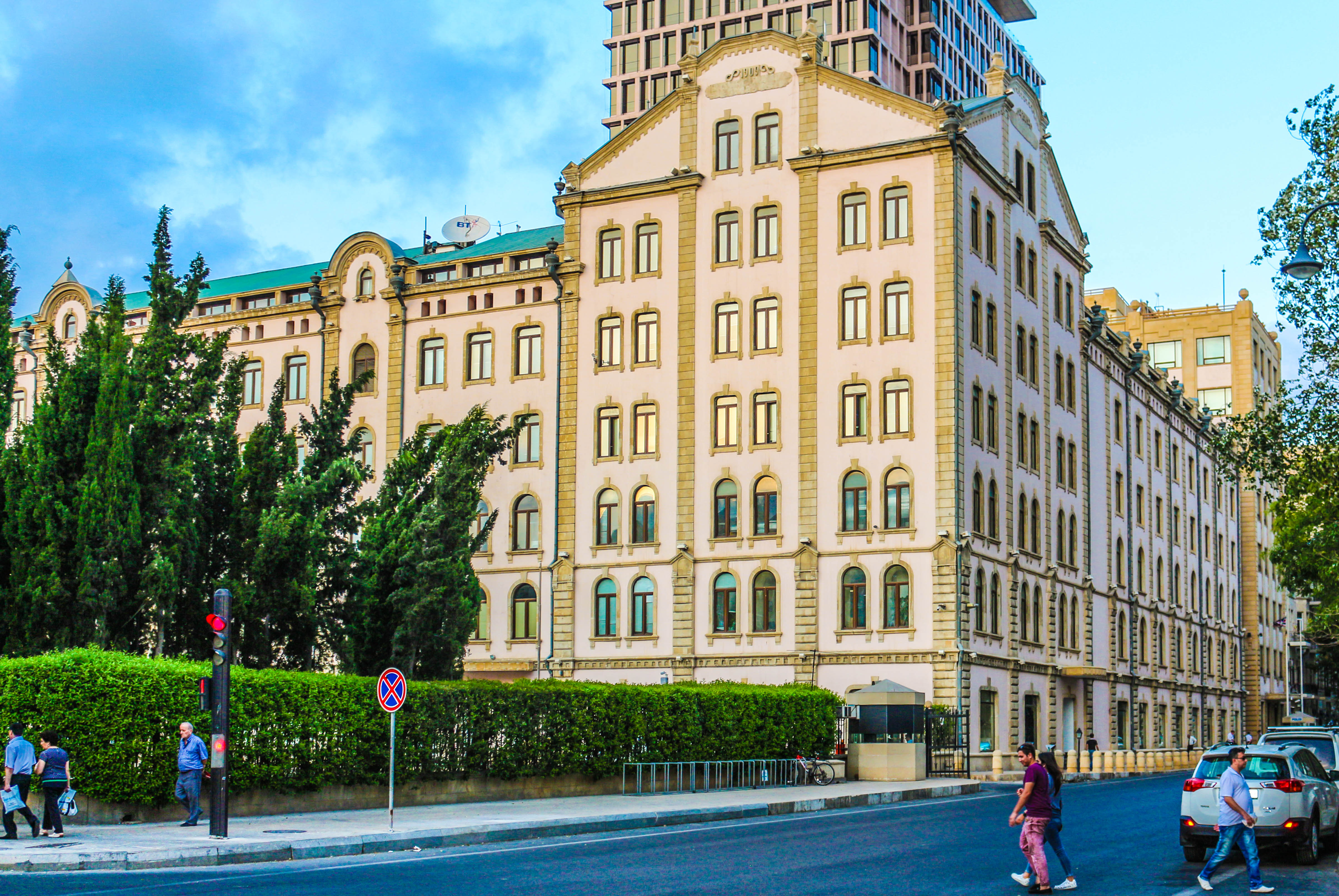
- Interactive map of the Skobelev Brothers' Mill area

General information
- Location: 80 Nizami Str., Baku, Azerbaijan
- Coordinates: 40.3754°N 49.8502°E
- Completed: 1903–1909

Skobelev Brothers' Mill (Azerbaijani: Skobelev qardaşlarının dəyirmanı) is a mill built in Baku by the representatives of the Molokan community, the brothers Sergei and Ivan Skobelev. Some sources claim that the mill was raised jointly with Haji Zeynalabdin Tagiyev. By the Decree of the Cabinet of Ministers of the Republic of Azerbaijan dated with 2 August 2001 No 132, the building was included in the list of immovable monuments of history and culture of local importance.

== Skobelev Brothers ==
Beginning with 1820, Molokans referred to the South Caucasus, Crimea, Siberia and other territories as of their religion. Molokans resettled in a number of regions of Azerbaijan were mainly engaged in agriculture. Before moving to Baku in 1860, Skobelev Brothers were engaged in farming in the village of Maraza, Shamakhi district, Baku province. Arriving to Baku, they became members of the second Molokan community. In 1872, Skobelev Brothers founded a mill with two steam engines.

== History ==
In 1902, Skobelev Brothers decided to build a new mill in Baku, but they met a serious resistance from Alexander Novikov, who headed the Baku City Duma in 1902–1904. Novikov especially stressed the fact that the Skobelevs were going to build “a mill in a part of the city, which, in less than ten years, will be the best in the city. The mill is an ugly, noisy, covered in soot building, causing anxiety among the neighbours. Such institutions belong to the outskirts.” But the Skobelevs, having won the members of the City Duma on their side, nevertheless received the construction permit. In 1904, the mill began operating with 100 workers. In a short time, the mill managed to take an important place in the economic system of the region. The average annual production of this mill in 1910 exceeded 3 million rubles, which made it the largest in the empire.

The building's walls thickness is 1 meter. It was built from limestone common on the Absheron Peninsula. The exterior of the edifice is made in the neoclassical style enriched with arched windows that perform both a decorative and reinforcing function. The building has a traditional L-shaped structure, typical to Baku buildings, to protect it from the strong winds blowing in the city at any time of the year.

The mill successfully continued to work during the years of the Soviet occupation. In 1987, it suspended its activities and was transferred to the balance of the Union of Artists of Azerbaijan. In 1996, the abandoned and vacant building was bought by an entrepreneur. After the renovation, during which the outbuildings in the courtyard were demolished and the interior was renovated, it turned into a business centre. Later, a round building (rotunda) was built in its courtyard, and a zone of green spaces was created around it. Over the years, new buildings of office and hotel type were added to the complex called Landmark. In 2002, a 9-storey building was constructed, and in 2010, a 22-storey one. Inside the complex's buildings there are various restaurants, hotels, conference rooms, offices of a number of foreign and local organizations and embassies.

== Gallery ==
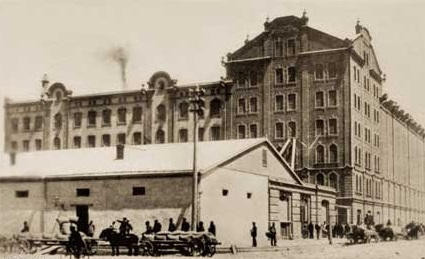

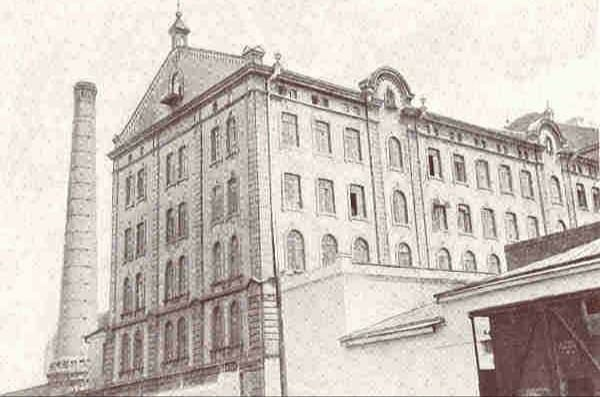

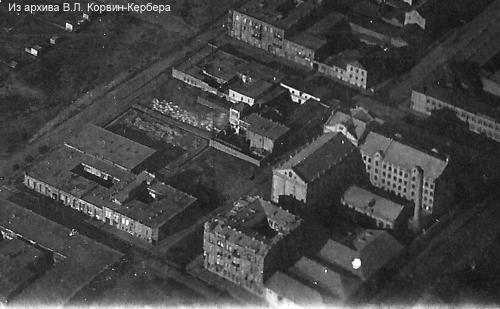

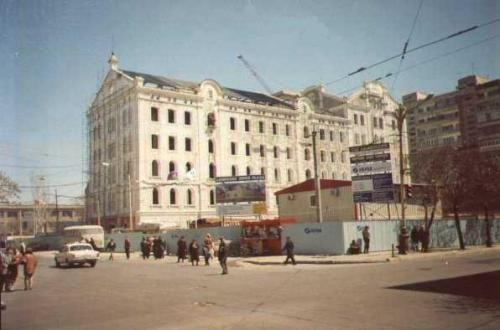

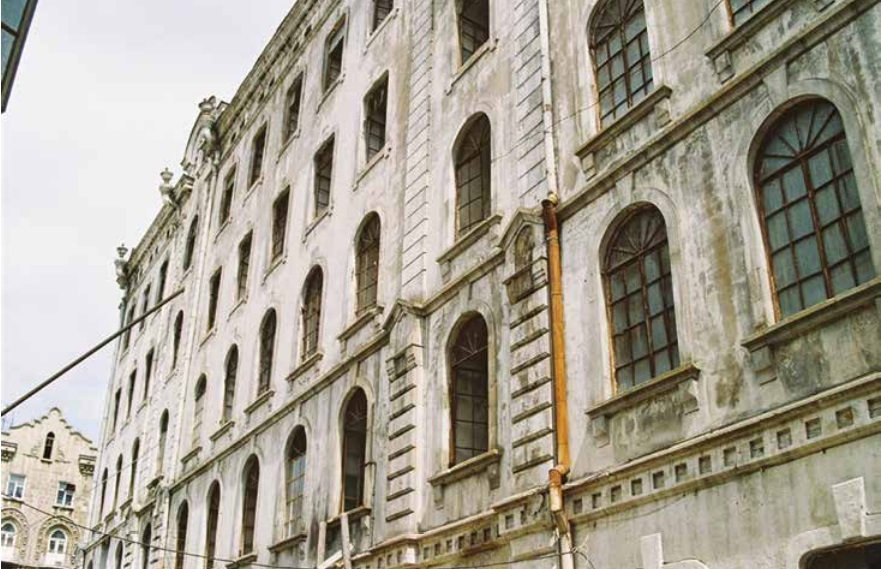

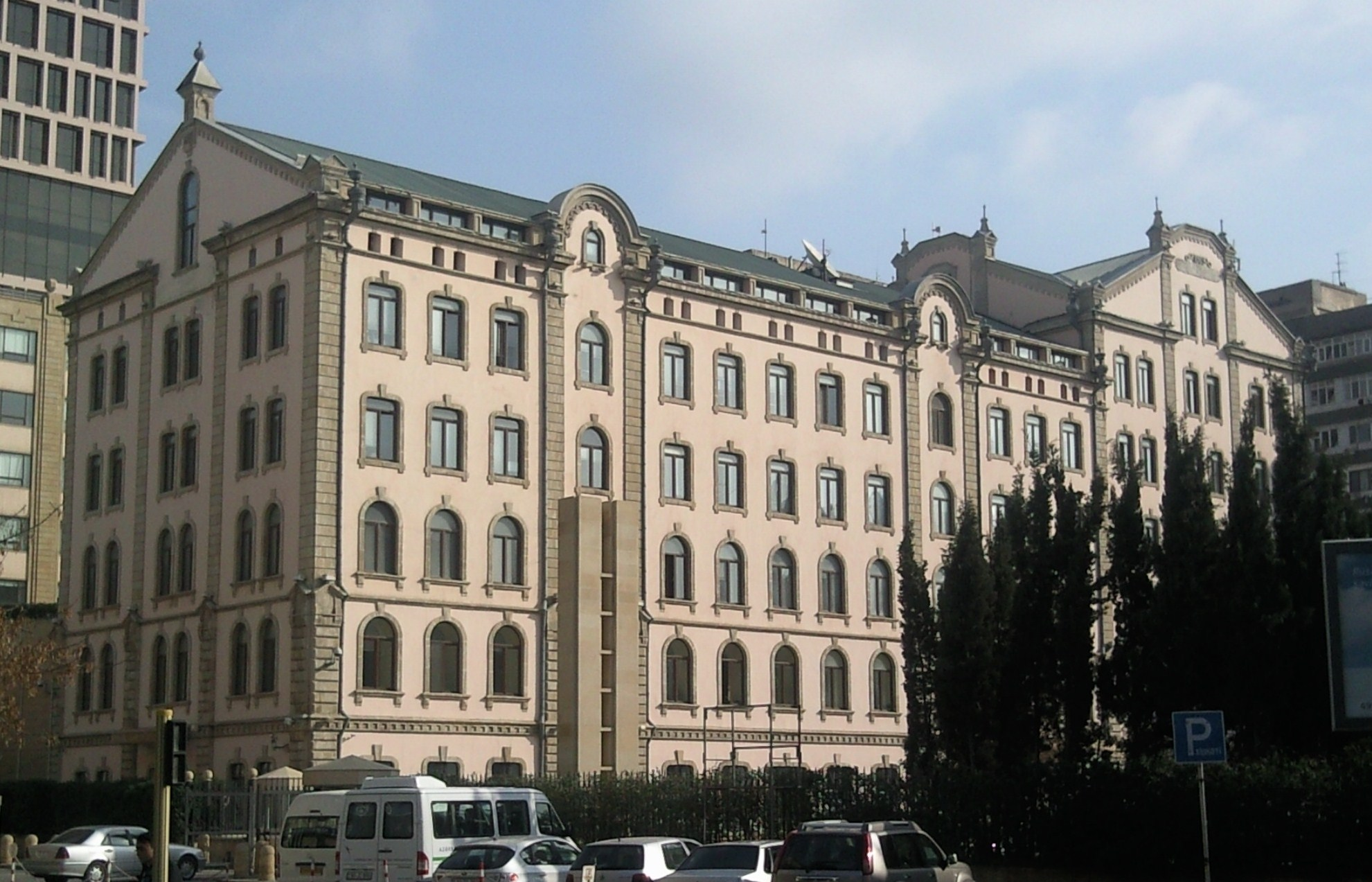

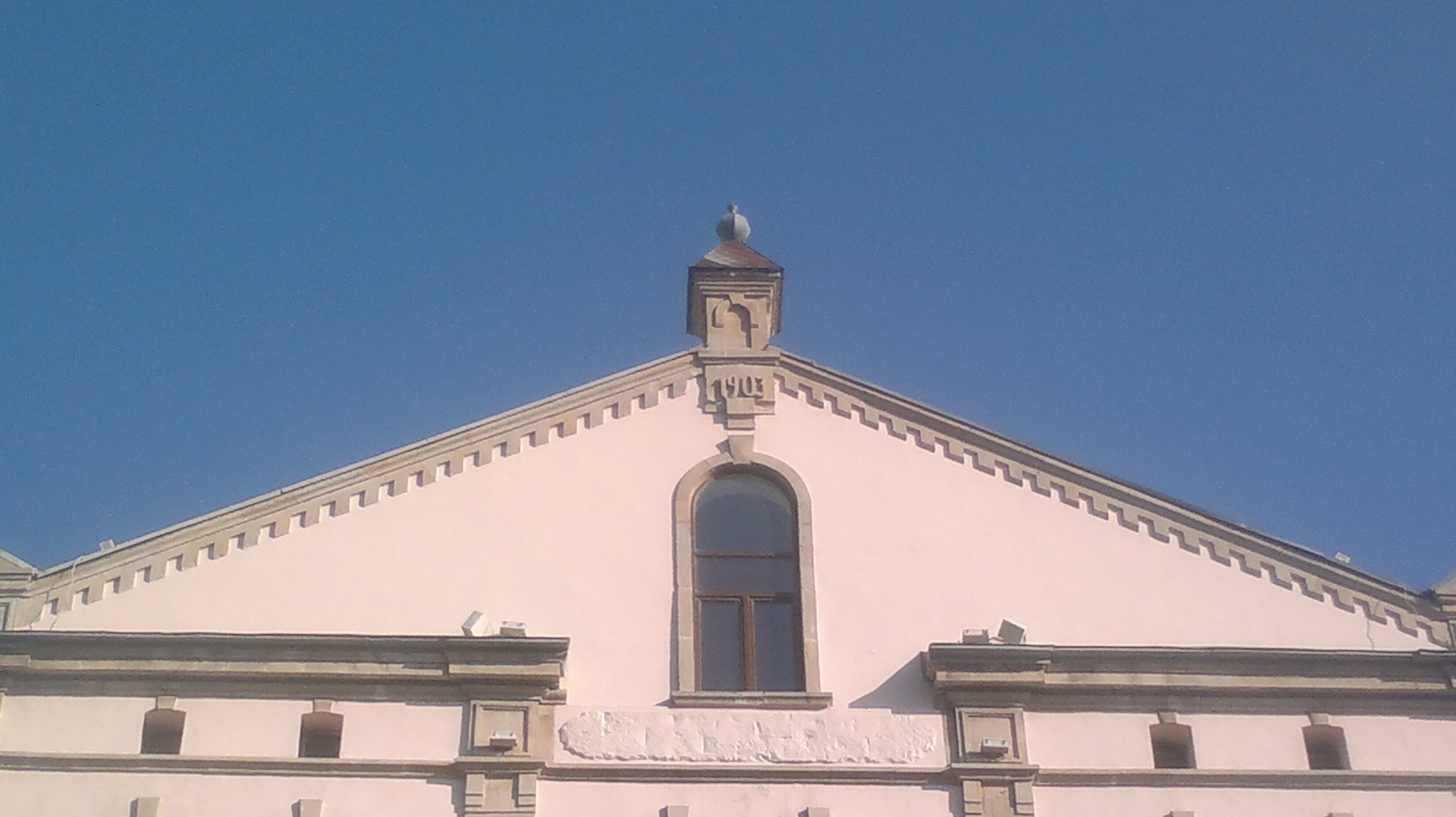

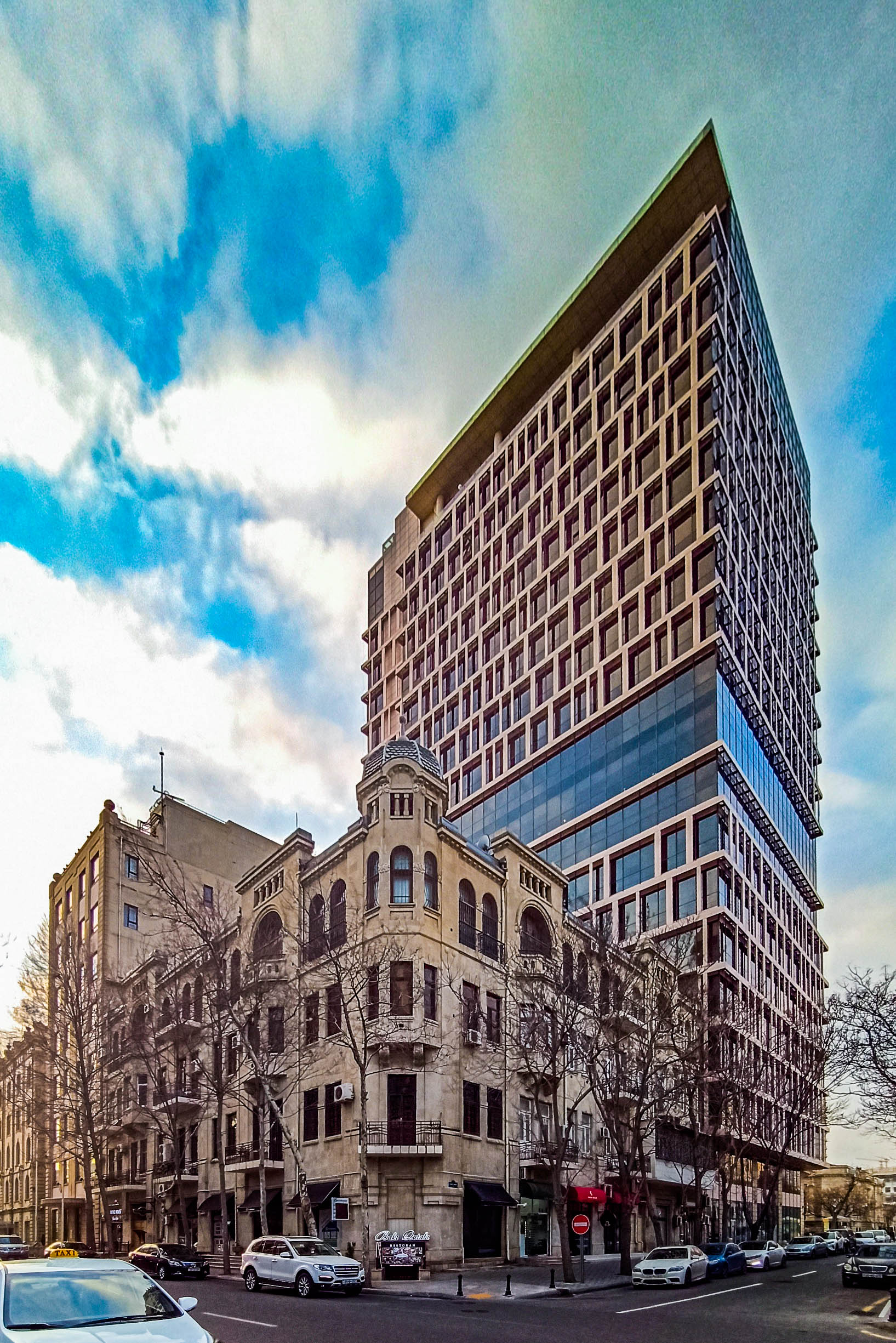

== Literature ==
- Boeri, Umberto; Muradova, Züleyxa (2021). L'Ambasciata d'Italia a Baku / La nuova Cancelleria dell'Ambasciata d'Italia (PDF). Bolonia: “Grafiche dell’artiere” nəşriyyat evi. Archived from the original (PDF) on 2021-10-29.
