= Kənzə =

Kənzə or Gənzə or Genzya or Kyanza or Genze may refer to:

- Kaw people
- Kənzə, Ismailli, Azerbaijan
- Gənzə, Nakhchivan, Azerbaijan
- GenZe (company)
