= Diogo Fernandes =

Diogo Fernandes may refer to:

- Diogo Fernandes (count), 10th-century Leonese nobleman
- Diogo Fernandes (Brazilian footballer) (born 1985), Brazilian footballer
- Diogo Fernandes (Portuguese footballer) (born 2005), Portuguese footballer
- Rodrigues, an island formerly known as Diogo Fernandes

== See also ==
- Diego Fernández (disambiguation)
