= 7th federal electoral district of Baja California =

Federal electoral district of Mexico

Baja California's 7th
- Electoral district of the Chamber of Deputies of Mexico

Incumbent
- Member: José Armando Fernández Samaniego
- Party: ▌Morena
- Congress: 66th (2024–2027)

District
- State: Baja California
- Head town: Mexicali
- Coordinates: 32°39′N 115°28′W
- Covers: Mexicali (part), Ensenada (part)
- PR region: First
- Precincts: 152
- Population: 408,704 (2020 census)

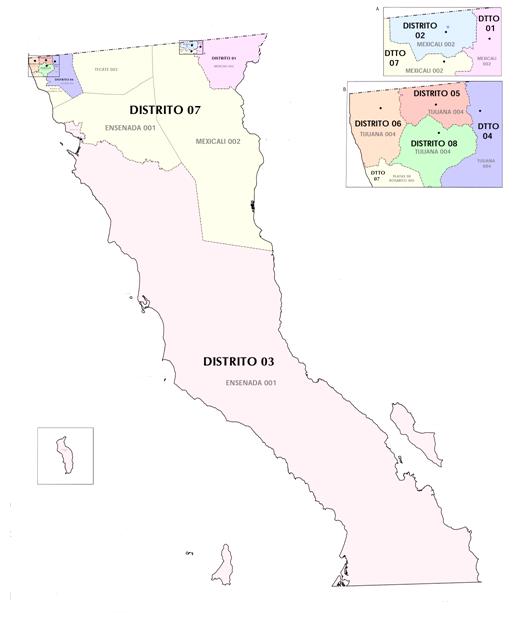
Baja California under the 2017–2022 districting scheme

Baja California's districts between 2005 and 2017

The 7th federal electoral district of Baja California (Spanish: Distrito electoral federal 07 de Baja California) is one of the 300 electoral districts into which Mexico is divided for elections to the federal Chamber of Deputies and one of nine such districts in the state of Baja California.

It elects one deputy to the lower house of Congress for each three-year legislative session by means of the first-past-the-post system. Votes cast in the district also count towards the calculation of proportional representation ("plurinominal") deputies elected from the first region.

The 7th district was created by the Federal Electoral Institute (IFE) in its 2005 redistricting process and was first contested in the 2006 general election. The current member for the district, elected in the 2024 general election, is José Armando Fernández Samaniego of the National Regeneration Movement (Morena).

== District territory ==
In its 2023 districting plan, which is to be used for the 2024, 2027 and 2030 federal elections, the National Electoral Institute (INE) increased Baja California's seat allocation from eight to nine. The 7th district covers 152 precincts (secciones electorales) in the municipality of Mexicali and 51 precincts in the municipality of Ensenada.

The head town (cabecera distrital), where results from individual polling stations are gathered together and tallied, is the state capital, the city of Mexicali. The district reported a population of 408,704 in the 2020 census.

== Previous districting schemes ==
Evolution of electoral district numbers
	1974	1978	1996	2005	2017	2023
Baja California	3	6	6	8	8	9
Chamber of Deputies	196	300				

2017–2022

Between 2017 and 2022, the 7th district covered portions of the municipalities of Ensenada (13 precincts), Mexicali (80 precincts), Tecate (41 precincts) and Playas de Rosarito (27 precincts). The head town was at Mexicali.

2005–2017

From 2005 to 2017, the newly created district comprised the municipality of Tecate, together with portions of the municipalities of Mexicali and Ensenada. The head town was at Mexicali.

== Deputies returned to Congress ==
(Mexico) National parties
- Current
- PAN
- PRI
- PT
- PVEM
- MC
- Morena
- PAZ
- Somos
- Defunct or local only
- PLM
- PNR
- PRM
- PNM
- PP
- PPS
- PARM
- PFCRN
- CON
- PANAL
- PSD
- PES
- PES
- PRD

Baja California's 7th district
Election	Deputy	Party	Term	Legislature
2006	Francisco Javier Paredes Rodríguez	National Action Party (Mexico)	2006–2009	60th Congress
2009	José Luis Ovando Patrón	National Action Party (Mexico)	2009–2012	61st Congress
2012	David Pérez Tejada Padilla	Ecologist Green Party of Mexico	2012–2015	62nd Congress
2015	María del Rosario Rodríguez Rubio	National Action Party (Mexico)	2015–2018	63rd Congress
2018	Érik Isaac Morales Elvira	National Regeneration Movement	2018–2021	64th Congress
2021	Juan Isaías Bertín Sandoval (Note: Bertín Sandoval was originally elected for Morena, but switched allegiance between them and the PT on several occasions during his term.)	National Regeneration Movement Labour Party (Mexico)	2021–2024	65th Congress
2024	José Armando Fernández Samaniego	National Regeneration Movement	2024–2027	66th Congress

== Presidential elections ==
Baja California's 7th district
Election	District won by	Party or coalition	%
2018	Andrés Manuel López Obrador	Juntos Haremos Historia	63.5280
2024	Claudia Sheinbaum Pardo	Sigamos Haciendo Historia	67.7840
