= Tubikənd =

- Location within Azerbaijan
- Coordinates: 40°42′32″N 48°11′14″E
- Country: Azerbaijan
- Rayon: Ismailli
- Municipality: Qoşakənd
- Time zone: UTC+4 (AZT)
  - Summer (DST): UTC+5 (AZT)

Tubikənd (also, Tubikend, Tubukend, and Tuvikend) is The village forms part of the municipality of Qoşakənd.
