= Cinli Zeynallı =

Jinli Zeynally
- Azerbaijani: Cinli Zeynallı
- Location within Azerbaijan
- Coordinates: 40°36′12″N 46°49′40″E
- Country: Azerbaijan
- District: Goranboy
- Municipality: Narimanly
- Time zone: UTC+4 (AZT)
  - Summer (DST): UTC+5 (AZT)

Cinli Zeynallı (also, Jinli Zeynally) is a village in the Goranboy District of Azerbaijan. The village forms part of the municipality of Narimanly.
