= Nərimanabad =

Nərimanabad may refer to:

- Nərimanabad, Lankaran, Azerbaijan
- Nərimanabad, Yevlakh, Azerbaijan
