= Francisco Javier Paredes Rodríguez =

Mexican politician

- Born: 4 December 1959 (age 66); Baja California, Mexico
- Occupation: Politician
- Political party: PAN

Francisco Javier Paredes Rodríguez (born 4 December 1959) is a Mexican politician affiliated with the National Action Party (PAN). In the 2006 general election he was elected to the Chamber of Deputies to represent Baja California's newly created 7th district during the 60th session of Congress.
