= Diego de Cáceres y Ovando =

Spanish nobleman

Diego de Cáceres y Ovando was a Spanish nobleman.

== Life ==
Diego de Cáceres y Ovando, first-born son of Diego Fernández de Cáceres y Ovando, 1st Señor of the Manor House del Alcázar Viejo, and first wife Isabel Flores de las Varillas, a distant relative of Hernán Cortés, was the 2nd Señor of the House de las Cigüeñas, at the Plaza de San Mateo of Cáceres, in which he succeeded in 1487, Corregidor of Valladolid, Comendador-Mayor of Alcántara, in which conventual church he was interred.

He was the older brother of Nicolás de Ovando y Cáceres.

He married Doña Francisca de Mendoza y Vera, daughter of Don Juan de Vera and wife Juana de Sandoval y Mendoza. Among other children they had, second born, Juan de Vera y de Mendoza, el Viejo.

== Sources ==
- Cunha, Fernando de Castro Pereira Mouzinho de Albuquerque e (1906–1998), Instrumentário Genealógico - Linhagens Milenárias. MCMXCV, p. 311
