= José Luis Ovando Patrón =

Mexican politician

- Born: 7 April 1970 (age 56); Mexicali, Baja California, Mexico
- Occupation: Politician
- Political party: PAN

José Luis Ovando Patrón (born 7 April 1970) is a Mexican politician from the National Action Party (PAN). In the 2009 mid-terms he was elected to the Chamber of Deputies to represent Baja California's 7th district during the 61st session of Congress (2009 to 2012).
