= Castle of Rebordãos =

Portuguese medieval castle

- Castelo de Rebordãos
- Bragança, Alto Trás-os-Montes, Norte in Portugal
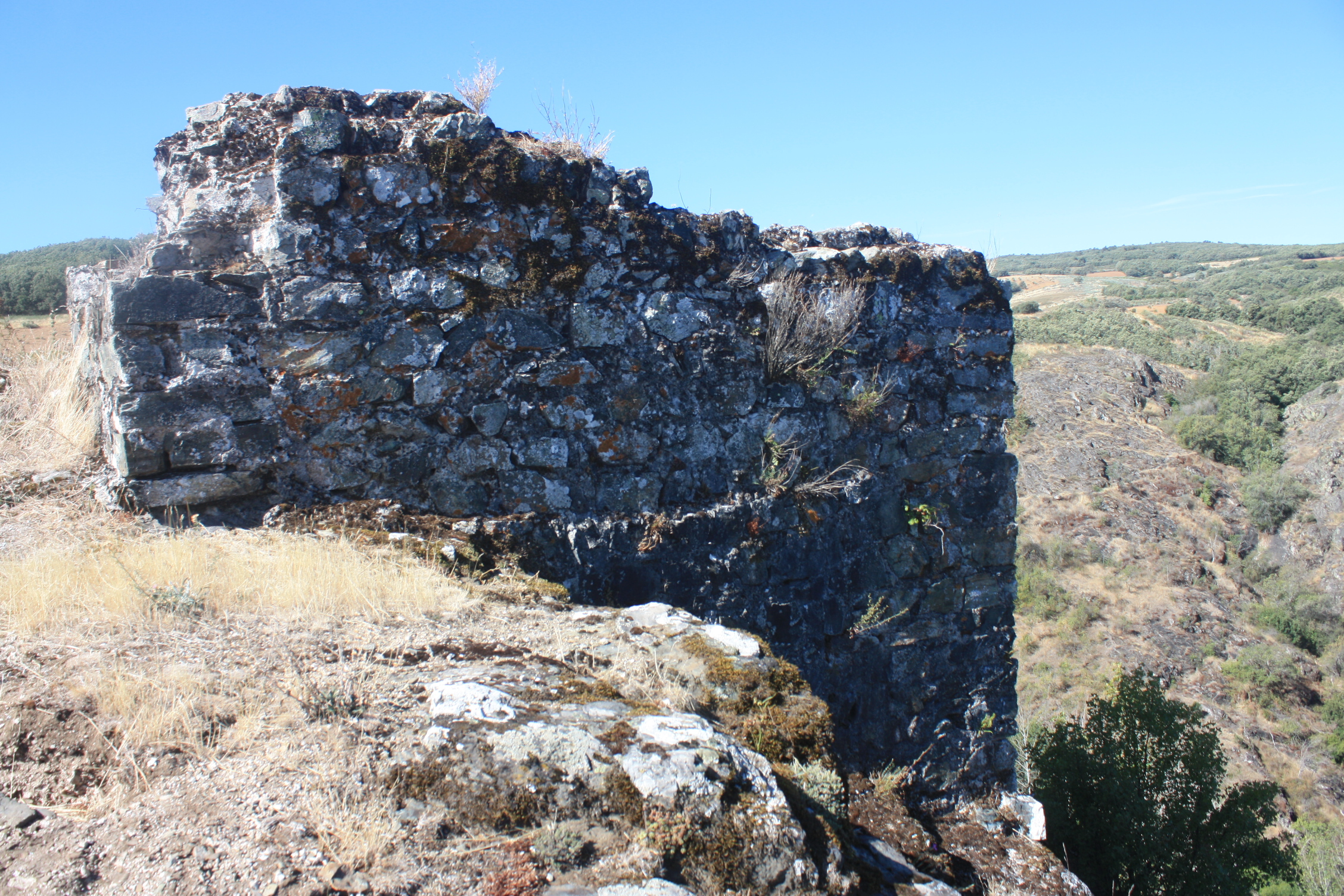
- Ruin of Castle of Rebordãos

Site information
- Type: Castle
- Owner: Portuguese Republic
- Operator: DRCNorte (Dispatch 829/2009; Diário da República, Série 2, 163, 24 August 2009)
- Open to the public: Public

Location
- Location of the castle within the municipality of Santarém
- Coordinates: 41°45′5.65″N 6°50′12″W

Site history
- Built: 1208
- Materials: Granite, Mortar

The Castle of Rebordãos (Portuguese: Castelo de Rebordãos) is a Portuguese medieval castle in civil parish of Rebordãos, in the municipality of Bragança, in the northern Trás-os-Montes region in district of Bragança. Due to its position on the top of a steep cliff face, the castle was also known as the Castelo de Tourão, or Castle of Polecats, referring to the small mammal indigenous to the region, and known for spotting from stakes, trees or poles. In this case, the title was a metaphor for its position at the top of the high cliff, providing clear visibility to the valley below.

== History ==
In 1208, King D. Sancho I issued a foral (charter) to secure the lands of this northern frontier. His successor, King D. Dinis re-affirmed the foral for the nearby settlement, and referred to the site of Rebordãos.

During the reign of D. Sancho, who sought to expand his authority in the northeastern Tras-os-Montes, Rebordãos was one of the early settlements to receive a charter in order secure Portuguese independence. The site has "One of the most ample and gorgeous panoramas in the Trás-os-Montes", providing a link to many of the other fortresses of Bragança, Vimioso, Outeiro, Penas Róias, Miranda and lands along the Douro River, towards Zamora in Spain.

Encompassing an elliptical plan, the castle appears to be the result of a campaign of public works during the 13th century. Yet, the fortress does not follow the traditional tendency to build in an oval form, characteristic of the military and administrative reformes during the reign of King Dinis (and typical of other Gothic castles in the Tras-os-Montes and Alto Douro region). In comparison, the castle followed the limits of the terrain. On the other hand, owing to the degree of ruin, it is difficult to comprehend the level of development. The interior system of defenses appear rudimentary, including the tower, making it difficult to understand its role in the structure.

The medieval importance of Rebordãoes is unclear. Its need as a lookout and sentry-post may have become diluted over time and with the loss of its military importance, whatever community existed have abandoned the site. The town definitely moved southwest, to a zone that was mild and sustained a human settlement. It is at the settlement the foral pillory and municipal house was installed, both dating to the 16th century; proving that, by that time, the old castle of King Sancho I had lost a great part of its importance.

On 1 June 1992, the ruins of the castle were placed in the stewardship of the Instituto Português do Património Arquitetónico (Portuguese Institute for Architectural Patrimony), under decree 106F/92 (Diário da República, Série 1A, 126).

== Architecture ==
The castle is situated in a rural environment, a short distance from the mountaintop, in a region of granite outcroppings and sparsely covered vegetation. Its plan follows an elliptical model, but little remains of the complete structure, except a curtain of walls between 1.5 and 3 metres (4.9 and 9.8 ft) thick. The access to the mountaintop is surrounded by crags and only accessible from the south (where the principal entrance was located) and east, over the Serra de Nogueira, towards the southwest. The northern and western flanks are steep, rocky cliffs making it difficult to access the structure.

The castle is inappropriately positioned to take on an effective role as sentry and, if its role was to defend the zone, then it should have been sited at the top of the mountain.

The abbey of Baçal, in the 20th century, identified a few interesting elements, namely the "remains of moats and walls of a metre and half length by three high", in areas of apparent weaker defense, or "walls forming small compartiments...houses for habitation?", in the interior. Elements which, together with other findings, await further investigation and archaeological excavations.
