= Diego Fernández (harpsichord maker) =

Diego Fernández Caparrós
- Born: 26 December 1703; Vera, Almería, Kingdom of Spain
- Died: 15 February 1775 (aged 71); Madrid, Kingdom of Spain
- Occupations: Harpsichord maker, musical-instrument maker
- Years active: ca. 1722–1775
- Known for: Builder of Iberian‑style harpsichords for the Spanish royal family invented pedal‑operated multi‑register instrument “Correggio” for Queen María Bárbara supplier to Domenico Scarlatti and Farinelli

Diego Fernández (1703–1775) was as an Andalucian musical instrument maker at the Spanish court in Madrid. He is known to have supplied harpsichords to Domenico Scarlatti and several of his pupils at court. He built instruments in the Iberian style, somewhat resembling Italian instruments, typically involving Pythagorean string scales and 2×8 foot choirs, but with construction elements more reminiscent of northern building styles, including heavier casing. He is, however, known to have supplied the famous castrato singer Farinelli with a four choir, five register, double manual harpsichord, operated using pedals and made at the behest of Queen Maria Barbara.

== See also ==
- List of historical harpsichord makers
