= Nərimankənd, Gobustan =

Nərimankənd
- Municipality
- Location within Azerbaijan
- Coordinates: 40°31′04″N 48°56′38″E
- Country: Azerbaijan
- Rayon: Gobustan

Population
  - Total: 3,358
- Time zone: UTC+4 (AZT)
  - Summer (DST): UTC+5 (AZT)

Nərimankənd (also, Narimankend) is a village and municipality in the Gobustan Rayon of Azerbaijan. It has a population of 3,358.

Nariman is a name of Persian origin (Persian: نریمان Narīmān), and Persian word کند kand or kend means village.
