= Nərimankənd, Sabirabad =

Village and municipality in Sabirabad Rayon, Azerbaijan

Nərimankənd is a village and municipality in the Sabirabad Rayon of Azerbaijan. It has a population of 2,330.
