= Nərimanlı, Goranboy =

Narimanly (Azerbaijani: Nərimanlı) is a village and municipality in the Goranboy District of Azerbaijan. It has a population of 1,229. The municipality consists of the villages of Narimanly and Jinli Zeynally.
