= Castle of Bragança =

Historic castle in Bragança, Portugal

- Castelo de Bragança
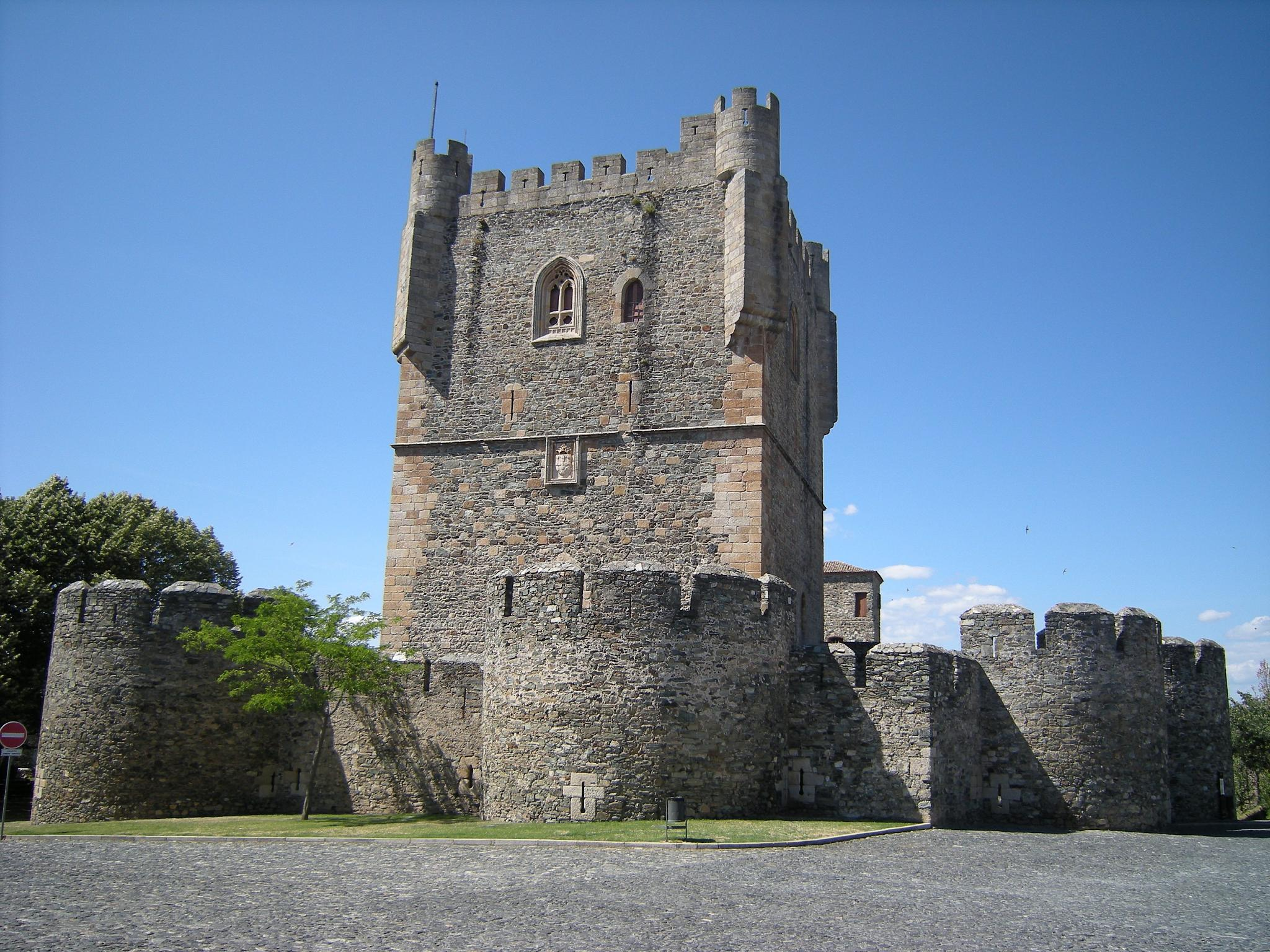
- Interactive map of the Castle of Bragança area

General information
- Status: Preserved
- Location: Santa Maria, Bragança, Portugal
- Coordinates: 41.8042°N 6.7492°W
- Construction started: 13th century
- Inaugurated: King Sancho II

The Castle of Bragança (Portuguese: Castelo de Bragança) is a well-preserved medieval castle located in the historic center of the city of Bragança, district of Bragança, Portugal.

The castle is very well-preserved. It has seen a turbulent history that saw occupation during the Moorish period to the devastation and reconstruction that accompanied the Christian reconquest of the Iberian Peninsula. Today, it stands as a monument to the history of Portugal.

== History ==
=== Early history ===
Archaeological evidence suggests that early human settlers in the region erected a fort of some kind. The fortification was later upgraded and enhanced by the Romans during their time in the Iberian Peninsula. However, the fortification was left in ruins when the Muslims entered. They rebuilt the castle.

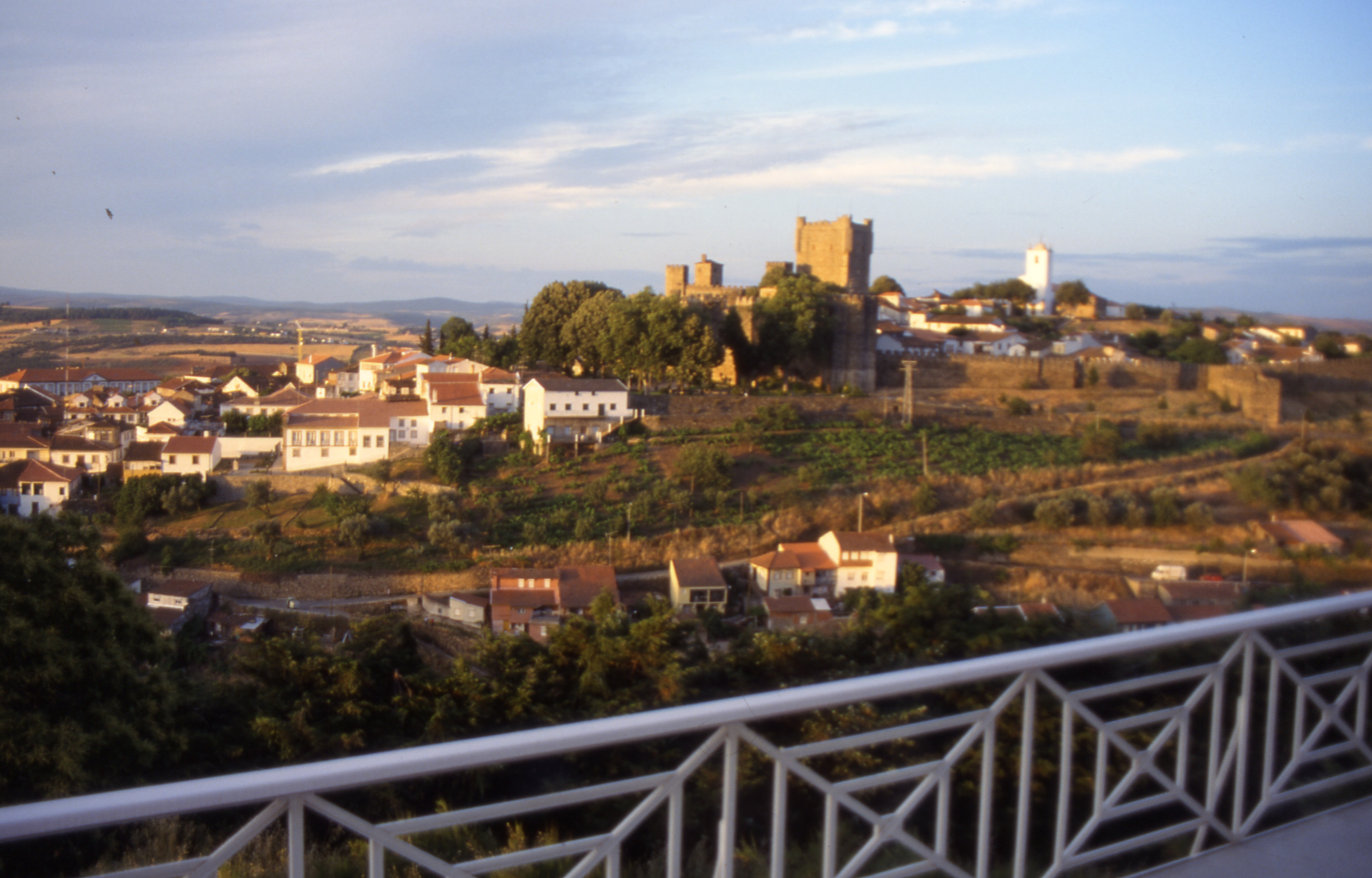
A perspective to the medieval Castle of Bragança

Archaeological evidence permits a determination of human settlement in this region to the Paleolithic. During the Neolithic there was a growth of productive human settlements which concentrated on planting and domestication of animals, with the beginnings of a nascent religion. There are many vestiges of these ancient communities, including ceramics, agricultural implements, weights, arrowheads and modest jewelry, all forged from rock. Many of these artefacts were found in funerary mounds, such as the tumulus of Donai (mostly destroyed). There are many signs of megalithic constructions dotted throughout the region. It is believed that the larger proto-historic communities developed in Terra Fria, probably in the final part of the Bronze Age (1000-700 BC). During this period, the Castro culture of fortified urban structures resulted in walled settlements, situated in elevated areas with a panoramic view, for defense. These communities were essentially survived on subsistence agriculture.

Roman colonization, which occurred late in the Roman era, resulted in the establishment of private property and movement away from the forests, in addition to organizational changes resulting administrative, material and cultural evolution. Remnants of the Luso-Roman castro societies are evident in Castro of Sacóias and the Castro of Avelãs. In these excavations, modern archaeologists have discovered funerary remains, coins and implements. The Castro of Avelãs (about three kilometres from Bragança) was an important centre on the military road to Astorga, although there are many examples (in Alfaião, Aveleda, Carrazedo, Castro de Avelãs, Donai, França, Gostei, Meixedo, Pinela, Quintela Lampaças, etc.) of the Roman presence. The area was dominated by two ethnic communities: the Zoelae, with their seat in Castro de Avelãs, and a Lusitanian civitas under the stewardship of the Baniense in the southern part of the district. A Latin map, Atlas de Gotha by Justus Perthes, mentioned three settlements within this region: Aquae Flaviae (Chaves), Veniatia (Vinhais) and Zoelae (its seat in Zoelas, today Castro de Avelãs) without mentioning any reference to a name similar to Bragança. During Roman colonization, it was part of Gallaecia and dependent administratively on Astorga, on the Atlantic axis of a Roman highway from Meseta, that controlled the gold, iron and silver trade. The references to a settlement with the name similar to Bragança occurred in the acts of Council Lugo (569 AD) regarding the Vergancia. A similar reference by Visigoth King Wamba in 666 BC referred to Bregancia, and where, supposedly two Christian martyrs (John and Paul) were born.

Records during the proto-Germanic Kingdom of the Suebi and Visigoth rule are rare, but have a smattering bit of records documenting rural agrarian and pastoral communities during their occupation. Toponymic references such as Gimonde, Guadramil and Samil are the few remains from this period.

=== Medieval era ===
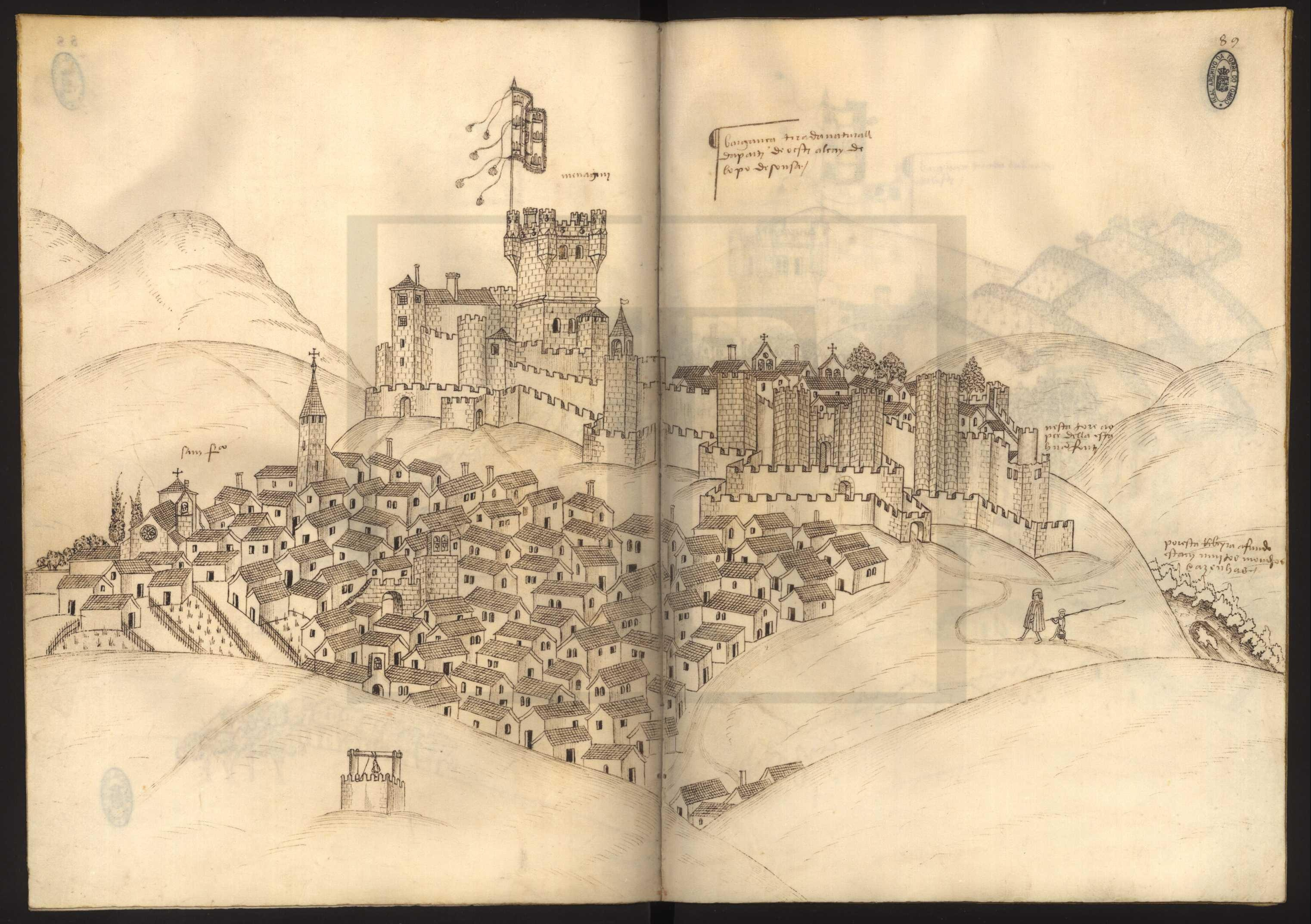
Castle of Bragança, Book of Fortresses 1509-1510

The castle was mentioned in a document dated July 7, 1128 that it was brought under control of King Afonso I of Portugal (1112-1185). For defensive reasons, the village was moved to the current site; It was near the hill of Benquerença on the sidelines of Fervença river, reusing them materials in the construction of new homes and a castle for defense of the people.

The town received its Foral Charter from King Sancho I (1185-1211). The sovereign endowed the village with funds to construct a wall and castle in 1187. During this time, the conflict between Sancho I and León resulted in violence and saw Leonese forces taken over the village.

During the reign of King Denis (1279-1325), the village erected a walled perimeter in 1293, signifying a prosperity of the village. His successor King Afonso IV (1325-1357) ascended the throne and seized the assets of his illegitimate brother. Defending its interests, Afonso Sanches started a rebellion, invading Braganza and leaving a huge amount of damage. King Denis' widow brought peace back. Conflicts between this sovereign and King Alfonso IX of León led to the region was invaded by forces from León (1199) to the reaction of the Portuguese sovereign.

In the midst of the 1383-1385 Portuguese succession crisis, the mayor of the town João Afonso Pimentel did not take sides, having conflicted feelings on taking sides. Later, the land was taken by the kingdom of Castile, only to be returned to Portuguese possession by the King John I in the Treaty of Segovia in 1400. He conducted massive reinforcement and strengthening of the defenses. The marriage of Afonso (1st Duke of Braganza) and Beatriz, daughter of Nuno Álvares Pereira started the House of Braganza. During their time, Afonso V (1438-1481) raised Bragança to city status.

During the reign of King Manuel I (1495-1521), the town and its castle's architecture and site plan were recorded by Duarte de Armas in his Book of Fortresses, published in 1509.

=== Post-middle ages ===
During the Portuguese succession crisis of 1580, Bragança sided with António, Prior of Crato. During the War of Restoration for the independence of Portugal, the ancient castle suffered damage. In a chapter of the Seven Years' War, Spain invaded Portugal, heavily damaging the castle.

On the eve of the Peninsular War, the eastern section of the castle was rebuilt. It had successfully repulsed Napoleonic troops.

=== 20th century to modern day ===
The castle of Bragança was classified by IPEGAR as a National Monument by Decree on 23 June 1910. The General Directorate of National Buildings and Monuments began extensive restoration and reconstruction of the walls. Since 1936, a historic military museum is housed on the premises of the keep.

== Characteristics ==
The castle stands at a height of 800 meters above sea level. Site floor plan indicates an ovoid plant with a battlements with a perimeter of 660 meters. The walls are reinforced by fifteen turrets. Walls two metres thick surround the historic core of the city, enclosing three hectares of land. The keep hosts the Church of Santa Maria and the medieval pillory. The main San Antonion port is a round arch within two turrets, and is defended by a barbican.

The walls are constructed using masonry shale rock that is in abundance in the region. It can be found in the corners and every opening. Originally a drawbridge was intended for the door, but has decayed since and was replaced by a heavy door. On the southern side of the castle, there exists a gun stone with the coat of Avis house. The top is crowned by battlements with cruzetadas battlements, balconies with boulders, with four cylindrical watchtowers at the corners, dominating the eastern side and the south side, two maineladas Gothic windows. A fence, reinforced by seven turrets (three east, three to the west and south) of circular plan, top the exterior of the tower.

From its walls, one can see the mountains of Montesinho to the north, Sanabria to the west and the Castle of Rebordões to the east.

== Legends of the princess tower ==
=== Noble knight ===
Local traditions states that when the village was still called Benquerença, there was a beautiful orphan princess who lived with her uncle, the lord of the castle. The princess fell in love with a noble young knight who did not possess great wealth. For this reason, the young man left the village in search of fortune, promising to return when he felt he had a worthy fortune to ask for her hand. For years, the princess refused all suitors, until her uncle promised her to a friend, forcing her to compromise. When she was presented to the uncle of her suitor, she confessed that her heart belonged to another man. This revelation infuriated her uncle, who thought of a ruse to coerce her to marry the one he chose. At night, he disguised as a ghost, and went through the ports of the Princess quarters, pretending to be the ghost of her lover, telling her to marry her suitor or otherwise be subject to damnation. As he was about to get an oath from her, the door to her bedroom opened with a bright ray of light, exposing her uncle's treachery. She went to live in the tower and the two windows became known as the Port of Treason and the Port of Light.

=== Jealous Husband ===
In historical times, it is claimed that it was inhabited by Sancha, sister of Afonso Henriques, as a refuge from the marital infidelities committed by her husband Ferdinand Mendes. The castle also served as a place of refuge of D. Leonor, wife of the fourth Duke of Bragança, accused (unjustly) of adultery by her own husband. The Duke eventually murdered his wife in Ducal Palace of Vila do Bispo on the steps on Nov. 2, 1512.
