= Fernando Fernández de Ovando =

Spanish diplomat and nobleman

Fernando Fernández de Ovando was a Spanish diplomat and nobleman.

== Life ==
Fernando Fernández de Ovando was a son of Hernán Pérez de Ovando and wife. He was a server of Ferdinand III of Castile and Alfonso X of Castile, the Wise, being his Ambassador at Rome, where he died.

He married and was the father of Fernando Fernández de Ovando, 1st Count of Torrelaguna and 1st Count of Uceda.

== Sources ==
- Cunha, Fernando de Castro Pereira Mouzinho de Albuquerque e (1906–1998), Instrumentário Genealógico - Linhagens Milenárias. MCMXCV, p. 402
