= Nariman Miftyayev =

Russian footballer

Personal information
- Full name: Nariman Shavkatovich Miftyayev
- Date of birth: 26 January 1991 (age 35)
- Height: 1.84 m (6 ft 1/2 in)
- Position: Defender

Senior career*
Years	Team	Apps	(Gls)
2009–2010	FC Neftekhimik Nizhnekamsk	1	(0)
2012	FC Neftekhimik Nizhnekamsk	0	(0)
2013–2014	FC Neftekhimik Nizhnekamsk	1	(0)
- * Club domestic league appearances and goals

Nariman Shavkatovich Miftyayev (Russian: Нариман Шавкатович Мифтяев; born 26 January 1991) is a former Russian professional football player.

== Club career ==
He made his Russian Football National League debut for FC Neftekhimik Nizhnekamsk on 7 July 2013 in a game against FC Angusht Nazran.
