= Nariman, Republic of Dagestan =

Nariman Нариман Махмут
- Selo
- Location within Republic of Dagestan Location within Russia
- Coordinates: 44°11′N 45°50′E
- Country: Russia
- Region: Republic of Dagestan
- District: Nogaysky District
- Time zone: UTC+3:00

Nariman (Russian: Нариман; Nogai: Махмут, Mahmut) is a rural locality (a selo) and the administrative centre of Koktyubinsky Selsoviet, Nogaysky District, Republic of Dagestan, Russia. Population: 1,790 (2010 census); 1,713 (2002 census); 1,351 (1989 Soviet census). There are 102 streets.

== Geography ==
Nariman is located 5 km northwest of Terekli-Mekteb (the district's administrative centre) by road. Terekli-Mekteb and Kalininaul are the nearest rural localities.

== Nationalities ==
Nogais live there.
