= Sancho Fernández de Ovando =

Spanish nobleman

Sancho Fernández de Ovando was a Spanish nobleman.

== Life ==
Sancho Fernández de Ovando, was a son of Fernán Pérez de Ovando and wife Luisa López de Moscoso. He was Bailiff-Major (Meriño-Mayor) of Castile.He was the father of Fernando Joanes de Ovando, 1st Duke of Limia.

== Sources ==
- Cunha, Fernando de Castro Pereira Mouzinho de Albuquerque e (1906-1998), Instrumentário Genealógico - Linhagens Milenárias. MCMXCV, p. 402
