= Nərimankənd, Bilasuvar =

Nərimankənd
- Municipality
- Location within Azerbaijan
- Coordinates: 39°32′00″N 48°23′54″E
- Country: Azerbaijan
- Rayon: Bilasuvar

Population
  - Total: 3,272
- Time zone: UTC+4 (AZT)
  - Summer (DST): UTC+5 (AZT)

Nərimankənd is a village and municipality in the Bilasuvar Rayon of Azerbaijan. It has a population of 3,272.
