= David Pérez Tejada =

Mexican politician

- Born: 19 November 1979 (age 46); Mexicali, Baja California, Mexico
- Occupation: Politician
- Political party: PVEM

David Pérez Tejada Padilla (born 19 November 1979) is a Mexican politician affiliated with the Ecologist Green Party of Mexico (PVEM). In the 2012 general election he was elected to the Chamber of Deputies to represent Baja California's 7th district during the 62nd session of Congress.
