= Fernando Alfón de Ovando =

Fernando Alfón de Ovando was a Spanish military and nobleman.

== Life ==
Fernando Alfón de Ovando was a natural son of Fray Diego Fernández de Ovando.

He was a Marshal (Mariscal) of Castile who lived at Cáceres with a house at the Parish of San Mateos in 1405, married to Teresa Alfón. Their daughter Leonor Alfón de Ovando married Fernán Blázquez de Cáceres y Mogollón, who granted a will at Cáceres in 1443, the parents of Diego Fernández de Cáceres y Ovando.

== Sources ==
- Cunha, Fernando de Castro Pereira Mouzinho de Albuquerque e (1906–1998), Instrumentário Genealógico - Linhagens Milenárias. MCMXCV, p. 401
