= Nariman Mammadov (composer) =

Azerbaijani composer (1928–2015)

Nariman Mammadov Nəriman Məmmədov
- Born: December 28, 1928; Nakhchivan, Nakhichevan ASSR, Azerbaijan SSR, USSR
- Died: April 6, 2015 (aged 86); Baku, Azerbaijan
- Burial place: II Alley of Honor
- Education: Hajibeyov Azerbaijan State Conservatoire
- Occupation: composer

Nariman Habib oghlu Mammadov (Azerbaijani: Nəriman Həbib oğlu Məmmədov, December 28, 1928—April 6, 2015) was an Azerbaijani composer, professor, People's Artiste of Azerbaijan.

== Biography ==
Nariman Mammadov was born on December 28, 1927 in Nakhchivan. After graduating from the tar class of the children's music school in Nakhchivan, he studied in the theory department at the Asaf Zeynally music school. He studied music theory from 1951-1956 and composition from 1956-1961 at the Hajibeyov Azerbaijan State Conservatoire.

In 1943, Nariman Mammadov started working as a music director in the Nakhchivan State Musical Dramatic Theatre. In 1946-1947, he worked in the orchestra of folk instruments of the Azerbaijan State Academic Philharmonic Hall, and in 1947-1961, he worked as a teacher in the Asaf Zeynally music school. From 1961 until the end of his life, he held the positions of junior researcher, researcher, and senior researcher at the Institute of Architecture and Art of the Azerbaijan National Academy of Sciences.

Nariman Mammadov died on April 6, 2015.

== Awards ==
- People's Artiste of Azerbaijan
- USSR State Prize
- Order of Lenin
