= Domus Municipalis =

- Antigos Paços Municipais de Bragança
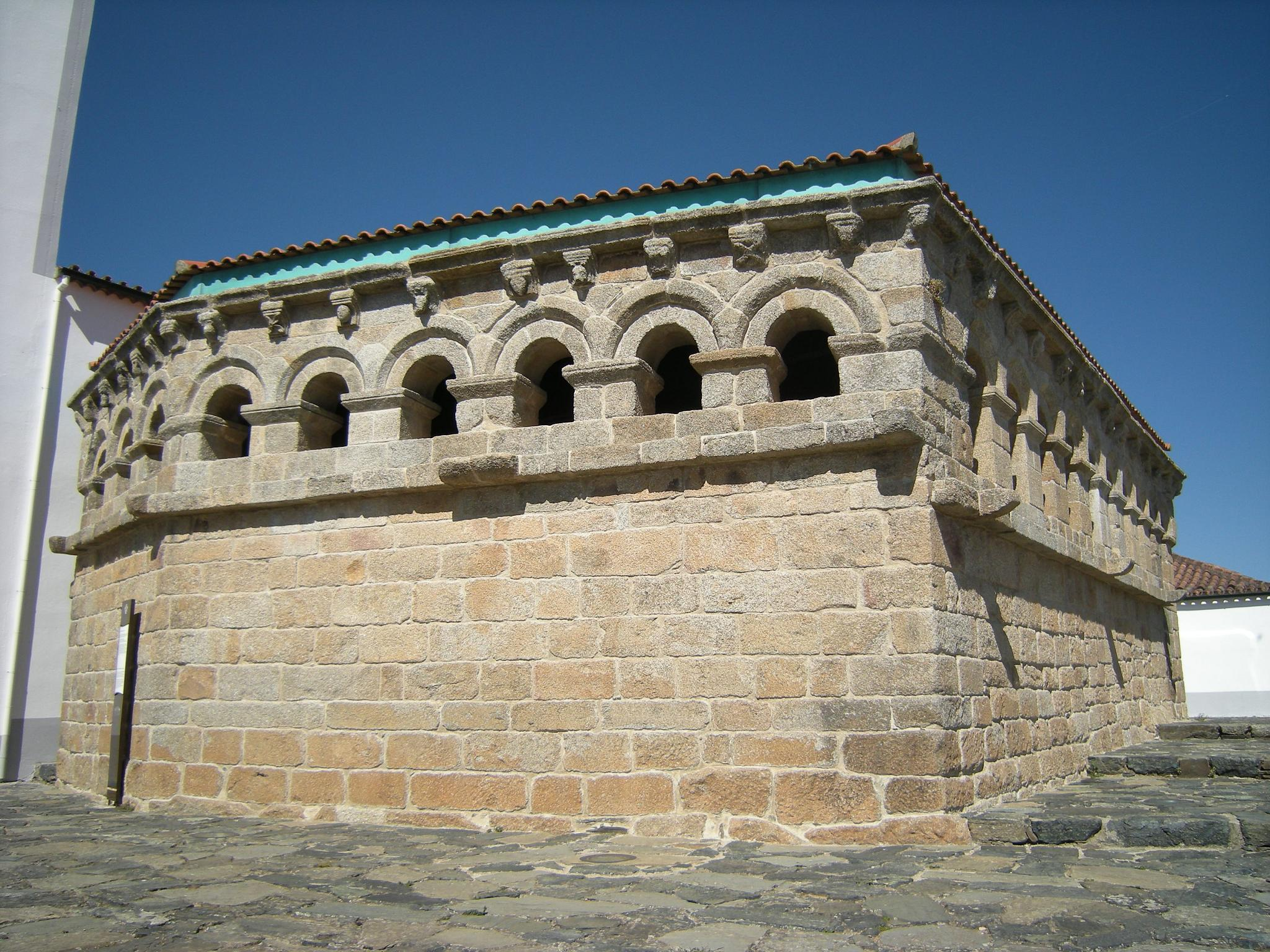
- The stonework of the Domus Municipalis, located along one of the walls of the Castle of Bragança
- Interactive map of the Domus Municipalis area

General information
- Type: Municipal hall
- Architectural style: Romanesque
- Location: Santa Maria, Portugal
- Coordinates: 41°48′12.81″N 6°44′55.96″W
- Opened: fl. 1250
- Owner: Portuguese Republic

Technical details
- Material: Granite

The Domus Municipalis (Latin: municipal house) is a Romanesque building in the northeastern municipality of Bragança in Portugal. The exact function of this building, even after research completed in the 20th century, is still largely unknown: it could have served as cistern, but there are doubts if this was its primary function.

== History ==
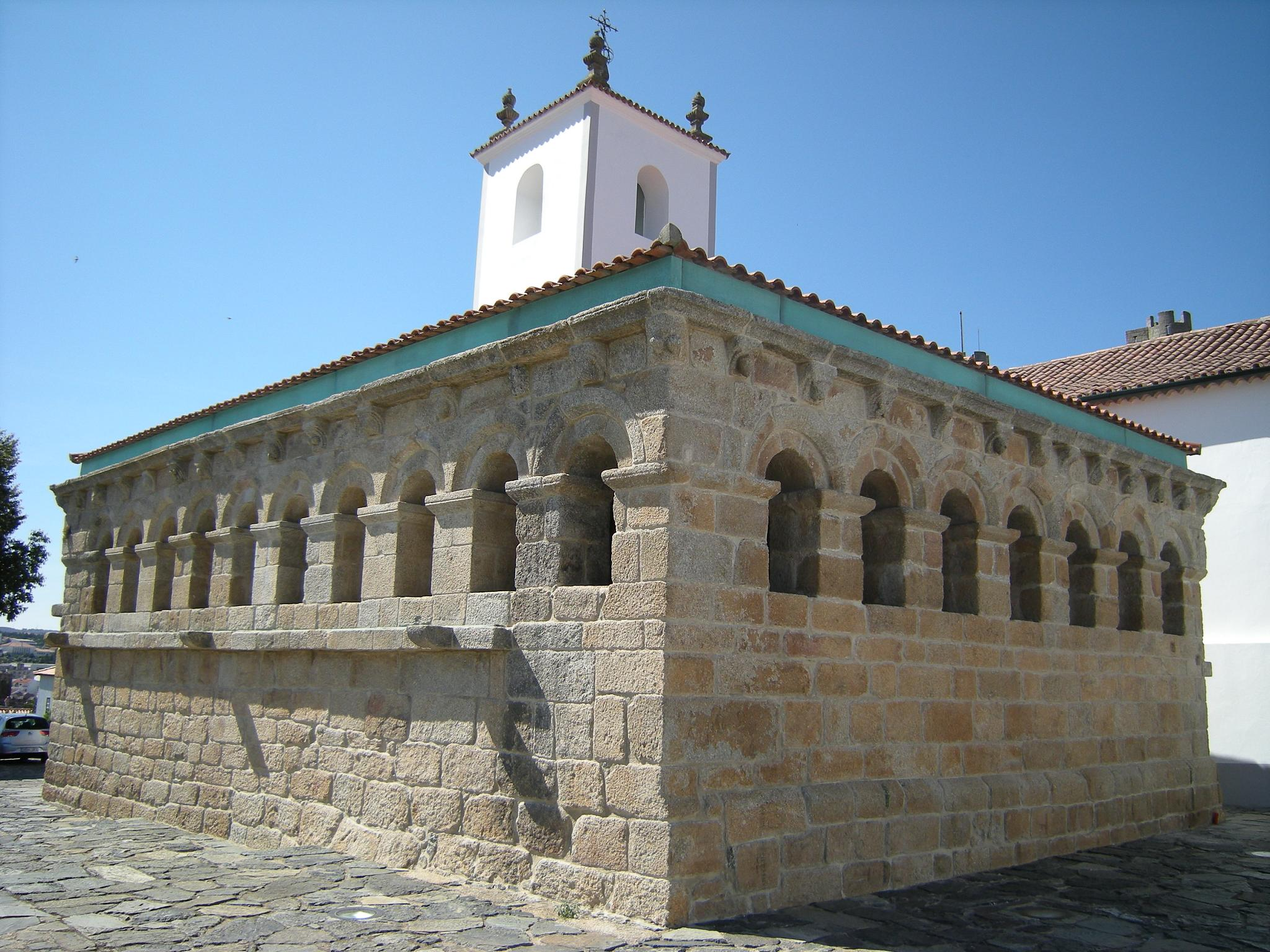
The inferior corner of the Domus structure

A singular (enigmatic) building of Romanesque civic architecture, it is an eloquent extension of the medieval prison tower that it juxtaposes. Its construction was, most likely, in the first half of the 13th century, coinciding with the foundation of the cistern.

In 1501, in the published writings of the Abbot of Baçal, the author referred to the local record of Martim Anes, who spoke of the construction of the Domus during his lifetime. In this account, Martin Anes stated that it was used as a meeting place for the "good men" of the municipality. By 1503, the Domus was remodelled to partition the hall into two divisions to formalize its use as municipal hall.

Its designation, Domus Municipalis, actually dates back to the 19th century.

Although the building was classified by the Instituto Português do Património Arquitectónico (IPPAR) as a National Monument in 1910, by 1912, the building was in a state of degradation, without appropriate roof and used by squatters and the poor as shelter. Restoration of the building was completed in 1936 by the Direcção-Geral dos Edifícios e Monumentos Nacionais (English: General-Directorate for Buildings and National Monuments), or DGEMN (which evolved to become the Instituto de Gestão do Património Arquitectónico e Arqueológico (IGESPAR)). Similar restorations were undertaken in 1959 by the Serviços dos Monumentos Nacionais (English: National Monument Services), before being taken over on 1 June 1992 by the IPPAR by decree 106F/92.

== Architecture ==
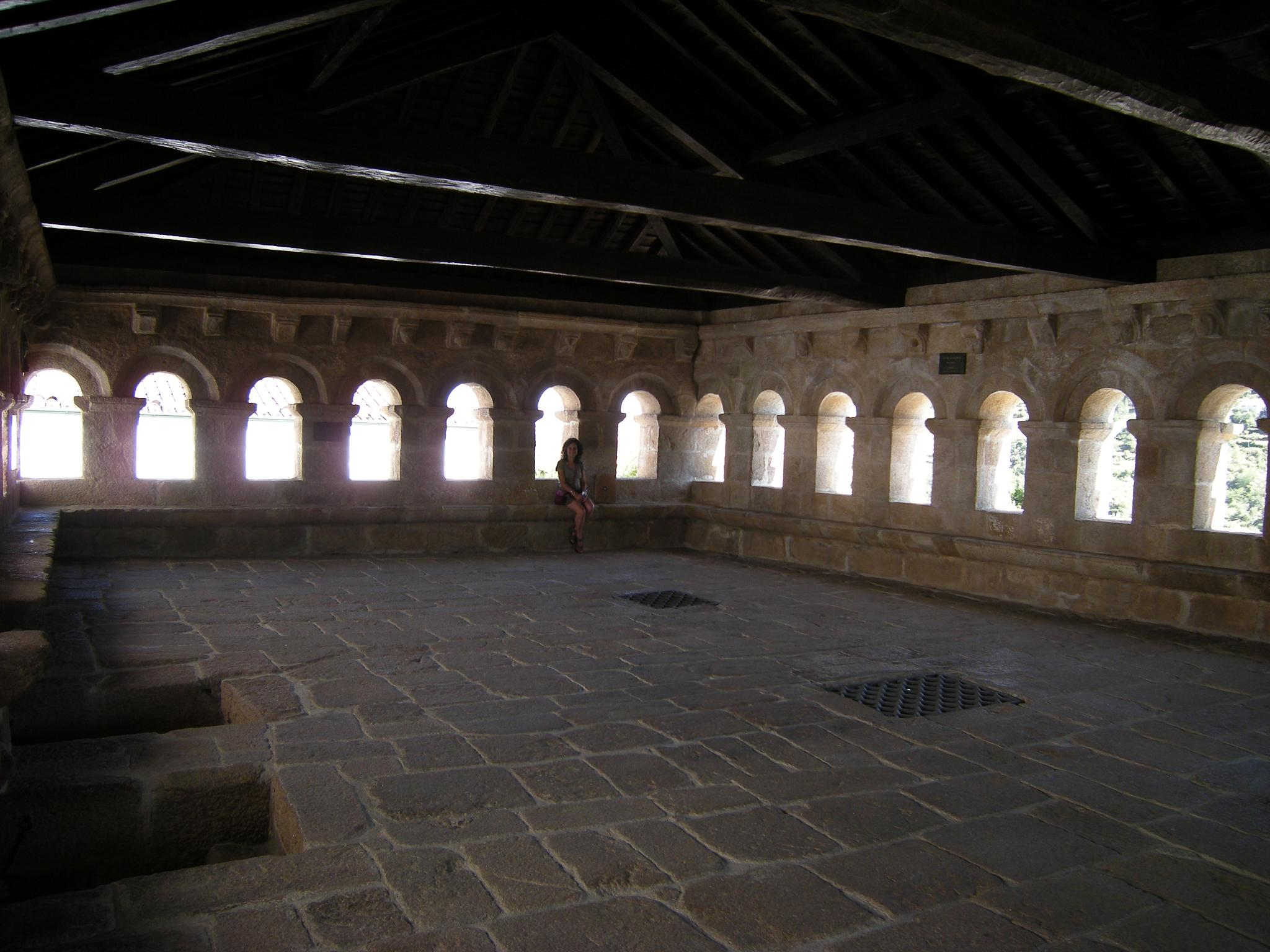
Interior dimension of the dual-purpose "municipal hall" (cistern drains in the centre)

Located in the Terreiro do Castelo alongside the Church of Santa Maria, the structure is based on a multi-level irregular pentagon, constructed of rounded granite blocks and held together by mortar, while covered by wooden roof tiles.

The Domus is constituted by two distinct spaces: the primitive cistern (documented after 1446), in order to store spring water; and a superior space that served as a gathering place for meetings of the "good men" of the community. It was in the first years of the 16th century that the municipalization of Bragança, from documents dated 1503.

In many of the documents, the building is referred to as the Sala da Água (English: Hall of Water).

One of the shields has been identified to have been sculpted during the modern era. Carlos Alberto Ferreira de Almeida noted that the other medallions, the diamond-shaped openings and the organization of windows, date the structure the beginning of the 14th century, or end of the 13th century. Near one of the entrances is a bronze plaque used by the archaeologist Gomez Moreno to indicate his investigations in the structure.
