= Qoşakənd =

- Municipality
- Location within Azerbaijan
- Coordinates: 40°42′46″N 48°13′32″E
- Country: Azerbaijan
- Rayon: Ismailli

Population
  - Total: 624
- Time zone: UTC+4 (AZT)
  - Summer (DST): UTC+5 (AZT)

Qoşakənd (also, Koshakend and Narimankend) is a village and municipality in the Ismailli Rayon of Azerbaijan. It has a population of 624. The municipality consists of the villages of Qoşakənd, Tubikənd, and Kənzə. During the Soviet period, it was renamed in honor of Azeri revolutionary Nariman Narimanov.
