= Nərimankənd, Gadabay =

Nərimankənd
- Municipality
- Location within Azerbaijan
- Coordinates: 40°43′33″N 45°46′15″E
- Country: Azerbaijan
- Rayon: Gadabay

Population
  - Total: 892
- Time zone: UTC+4 (AZT)
  - Summer (DST): UTC+5 (AZT)

Nərimankənd (also, Orconikidze, Narimankend, and Ordzhonikidze) is a village and municipality in the Gadabay Rayon of Azerbaijan. It has a population of 892. During the Soviet period, the village was named in honor of Sergo Ordzhonikidze.
