= Diego Fernández de Proaño =

Spanish explorer and conquistador

Diego Fernández de Proaño was a Spanish explorer and conquistador who served with Nuño Beltrán de Guzmán in the exploration of New Galicia. He was named Justice Major of the city of San Miguel de Culiacán by Guzmán and was later accused of abusing his power to enslave hundreds of local indigenous inhabitants in direct violation of orders from the newly established province's governor. He was the son of Juan de Proaño and of Ana de Cervantes.
