= Nərimanabad, Yevlakh =

Village in Yevlakh Rayon, Azerbaijan

Coordinates: 40.60776°N 47.054136°E

Nərimanabad is a village in the Yevlakh Rayon of Azerbaijan. It has a population of 1,680.
