= Nərimanlı, Shamkir =

Nərimanlı
- Municipality
- Location within Azerbaijan
- Coordinates: 40°40′58″N 46°05′03″E
- Country: Azerbaijan
- Rayon: Shamkir

Population
  - Total: 334
- Time zone: UTC+4 (AZT)
  - Summer (DST): UTC+5 (AZT)

Nərimanlı is a village and municipality in the Shamkir Rayon of Azerbaijan. It has a population of 334.
