= Kənzə, Ismailli =

Kənzə
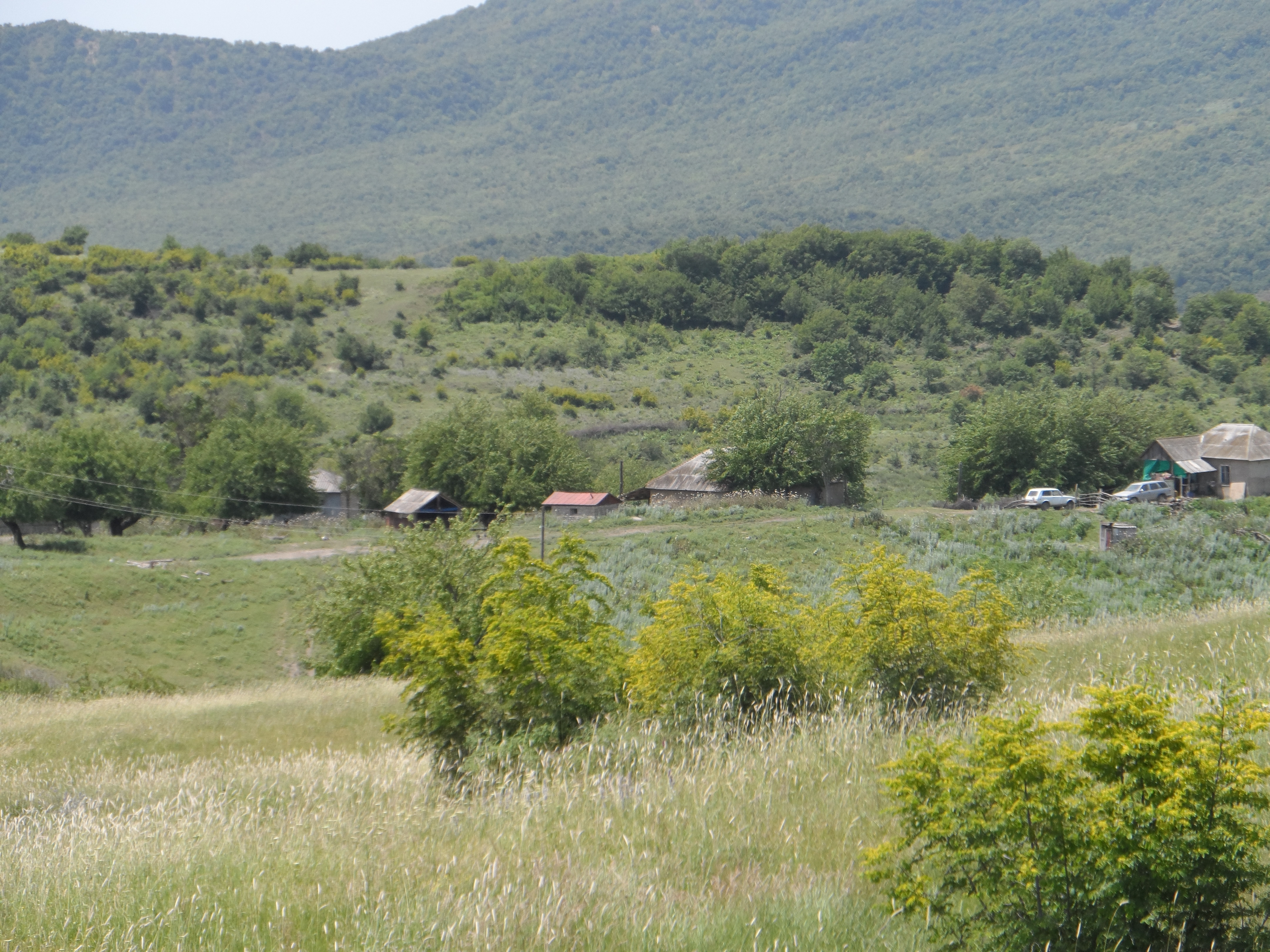

- Location within Azerbaijan
- Coordinates: 40°40′56″N 48°12′14″E
- Country: Azerbaijan
- Rayon: Ismailli
- Municipality: Qoşakənd

Population (2014)
  - Total: 3
- Time zone: UTC+4 (AZT)
  - Summer (DST): UTC+5 (AZT)

Kənzə (also, Ganza and Genzya) is a village in the Ismailli Rayon of Azerbaijan. The village forms part of the municipality of Qoşakənd. According to Azerbaijan's State Statistics Committee, only three people lived in the village as of 2014.
