= Diego Fernández de Cáceres y Ovando =

Spanish noble

Diego Fernández de Cáceres y Ovando (– Monleón, aft. February 2, 1487) was a Spanish military and nobleman.

== Life ==
Diego Fernández de Cáceres y Ovando was a son of Fernán Blázquez de Cáceres y Mogollón, who granted a will at Cáceres in 1443, and wife Leonor Alfón de Ovando, daughter of Fernando Alfón de Ovando and wife Teresa Alfón (seventh grandparents in male line of the conqueror of the castle of Brindis, Italian city and sea port in the Adriatic, formerly called Brundisium and currently Brindisi, Francisco José de Ovando, 1st Marquis of Brindisi, and his brother Alonso Pablo de Ovando y Solís Rol de La Cerda, 2nd Marqués de Brindis), and paternal grandson of Fernán Blázquez de Cáceres and wife Juana González.

He was the 1st Lord of the Manor House del Alcázar Viejo, which place was granted de jure by Henry IV of Castile by Royal Cedule of July 16, 1473, famous Captain of the aforementioned King and of the Catholic Monarchs since 1475, Alcalde of Benquerencia and Monleón, where he died in 1487, having tested on February 2.

He was firstly married to Isabel Flores de las Varillas, Dame of Queen Isabel I of Castile, daughter of Rodrigo Flores de las Varillas, a distant relative of Hernán Cortés, and wife María Estebán Tejado de Paredes.

He grew up and learned the military art at the house of the Infant Lord King John II of Navarre and his services are historical.

They had at least two sons, first born Diego de Cáceres y Ovando and Nicolás de Ovando y Cáceres.

He was the ascendant of the Marqueses de Leganés (Mesía, on June 22, 1627, Grandees of Spain in 1640), Loriana (Velázquez-Dávila, December 19, 1591) and La Puebla de Ovanda (Velázquez-Dávila, March 10, 1627), Vizcondes de Penapardo, Condes de La Gomera with a Coat of Arms of de Herrera (de Herrera, 1487, also Señores de las Islas Canarias), de Oliva de Gaytan with a Coat of Arms of de Galarza (de Galarza, May 18, 1649), Fuenterubia, etc.

== Sources ==
- Cunha, Fernando de Castro Pereira Mouzinho de Albuquerque e (1906–1998), Instrumentário Genealógico - Linhagens Milenárias. MCMXCV, pp. 311–2
- Instituto de Salazar y Castro, Elenco de Grandezas y Titulos Nobiliarios Españoles. Various (periodic publication)
