= Sé, Santa Maria e Meixedo =

- Civil parish
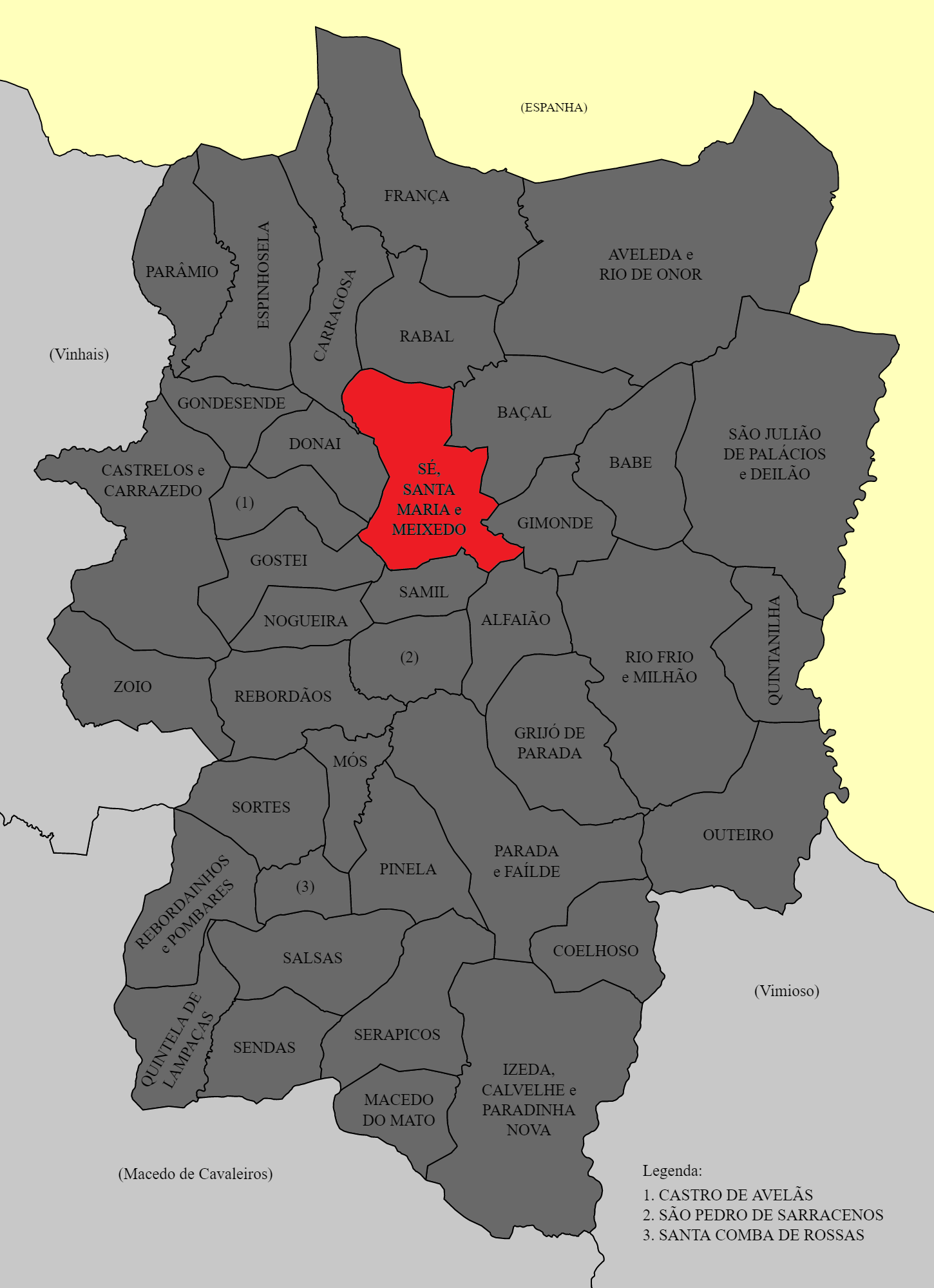
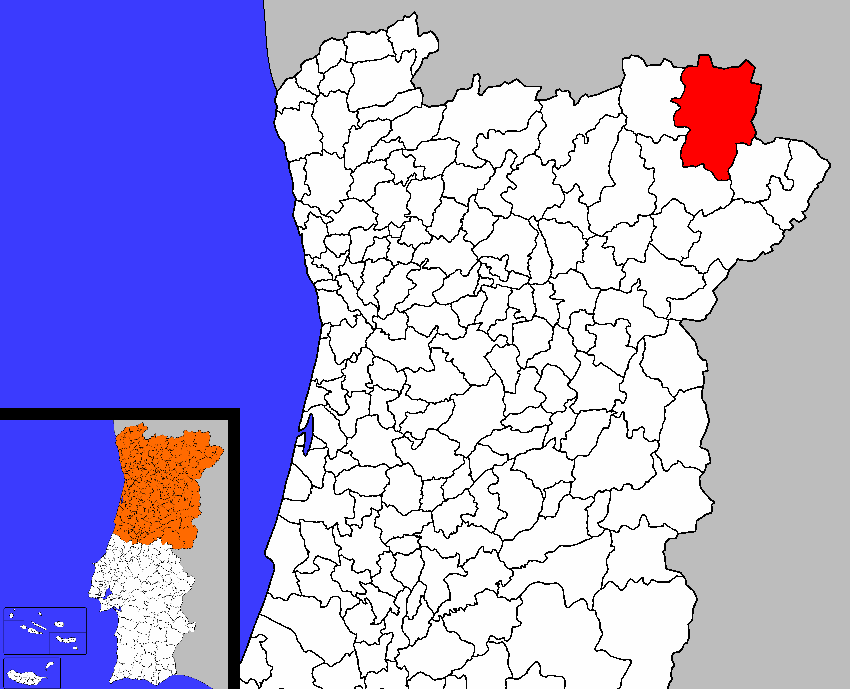
- Coordinates: 41.807°N 6.754°W
- Country: Portugal
- Region: Norte
- Intermunic. comm.: Terras de Trás-os-Montes
- District: Bragança
- Municipality: Bragança

Area
  - Total: 35.69 km^{2} (13.78 sq mi)

Population (2011)
  - Total: 22,016
  - Density: 616.9/km^{2} (1,598/sq mi)
- Time zone: UTC+00:00 (WET)
  - Summer (DST): UTC+01:00 (WEST)

Sé, Santa Maria e Meixedo is a civil parish in the municipality of Bragança, Portugal. It was formed in 2013 by the merger of the former parishes Sé, Santa Maria and Meixedo. The population in 2011 was 22,016, in an area of 35.69 km^{2}. It forms the city centre of Bragança.

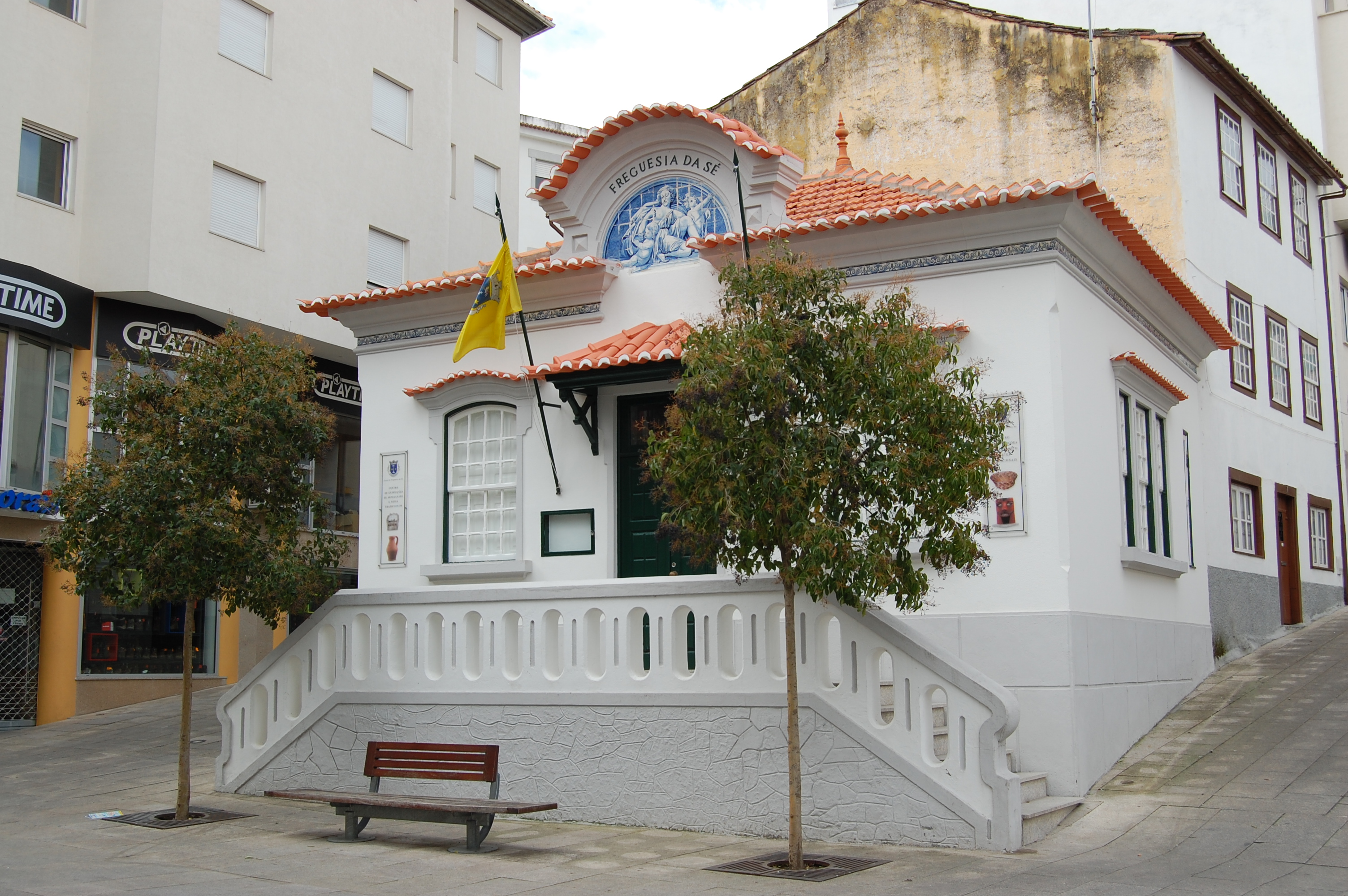
Parish headquarters

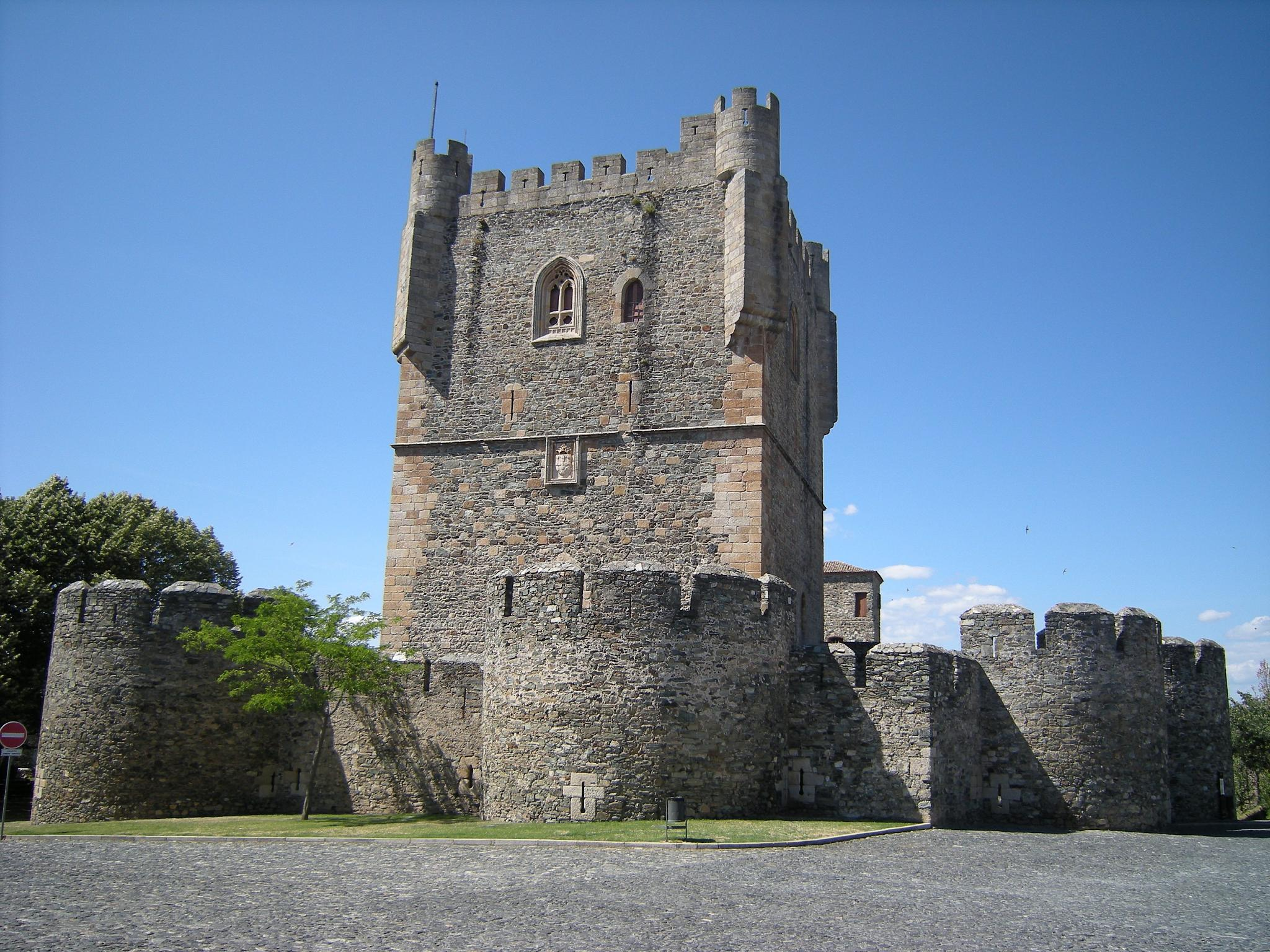
Castle of Bragança
