= Hernán Pérez de Ovando =

13th-century Spanish nobleman

Hernán Pérez de Ovando was a Spanish military man and nobleman.

== Life ==
Hernán Pérez de Ovando was a son of Pedro Fernández de Ovando and wife María de Azagra. He served Ferdinand II of León and Alfonso IX of León, specially at the Conquest of Cáceres on April 23, 1229, which village and alcázar were given to him in fiefdom of honour in 1230. In 1232 he received from his brother Rodrigo Pérez de Ovando, 1st Count of Ciudad Rodrigo the donation of the part that corresponded to him at the Conquest of Cáceres.

He married and was the father of Fernando Fernández de Ovando.

== Sources ==
- Cunha, Fernando de Castro Pereira Mouzinho de Albuquerque e (1906–1998), Instrumentário Genealógico - Linhagens Milenárias. MCMXCV, p. 402
