= Benquerencia =

Coordinates: 39°18′38″N 6°05′04″W

Benquerencia, Spain
- municipality
- Flag Coat of arms
- Interactive map of Benquerencia, Spain
- Country: Spain
- Autonomous community: Extremadura
- Province: Cáceres
- Municipality: Benquerencia

Area
  - Total: 13 km^{2} (5.0 sq mi)

Population (2025-01-01)
  - Total: 74
  - Density: 5.7/km^{2} (15/sq mi)
- Time zone: UTC+1 (CET)
  - Summer (DST): UTC+2 (CEST)

Benquerencia (Spanish pronunciation: [beŋkeˈɾenθja]) is a municipality located in the province of Cáceres, Extremadura, Spain. According to the 2006 census (INE), the municipality has a population of 98 inhabitants.

== Gallery ==
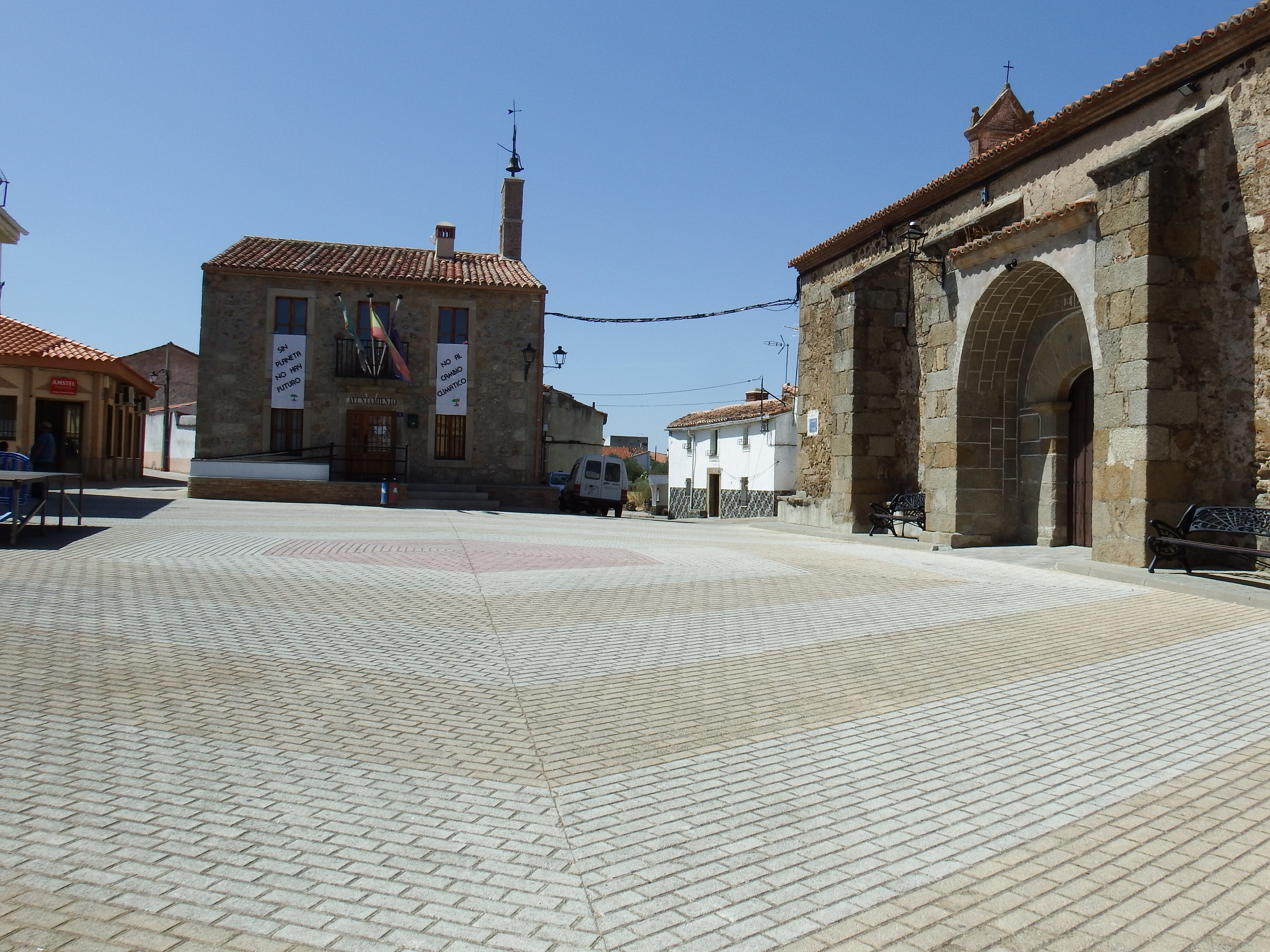
Church in Benquerencia town.

== See also ==
- List of municipalities in Cáceres
