= Diego Fernández de Ovando =

Fray Diego Fernández de Ovando was a Spanish military and nobleman.

== Life ==
Diego Fernández de Ovando was a son of Fernando Fernández de Ovando, second son, and wife Francisca de Ulloa, and paternal grandson of Fernando Fernández de Ovando, 1st Count of Torrelaguna and 1st Count of Uceda, and wife Ora Blázquez Trillo, Lady of Talamanca.

He was a Professed Knight of the Habit of Alcántara, Commander of Lares at the time of Master Don Nuno Chamiço elected in 1338.

He had a natural son, Fernando Alfón de Ovando.

== Sources ==
- Cunha, Fernando de Castro Pereira Mouzinho de Albuquerque e (1906–1998), Instrumentário Genealógico - Linhagens Milenárias. MCMXCV, p. 401
