= Neriman Ovando =

Dominican footballer

Personal information
- Full name: Neriman Antonio Ovando Rosario
- Date of birth: March 23, 1991 (age 35)
- Place of birth: Dominican Republic
- Position: Midfielder

Team information
- Current team: Bauger FC

Senior career*
Years	Team	Apps	(Gls)
2015–	Bauger FC		

International career
2016–	Dominican Republic	1	(0)
- * Club domestic league appearances and goals

Neriman Ovando (born March 23, 1991) is a Dominican footballer who currently plays for Bauger FC, and has for his entire career. He has been capped once by the Dominican Republic national football team in a match against Curaçao.
