= Gobustan State Historical and Cultural Reserve =

National park in Azerbaijan

Gobustan Rock Art Cultural Landscape
UNESCO World Heritage Site
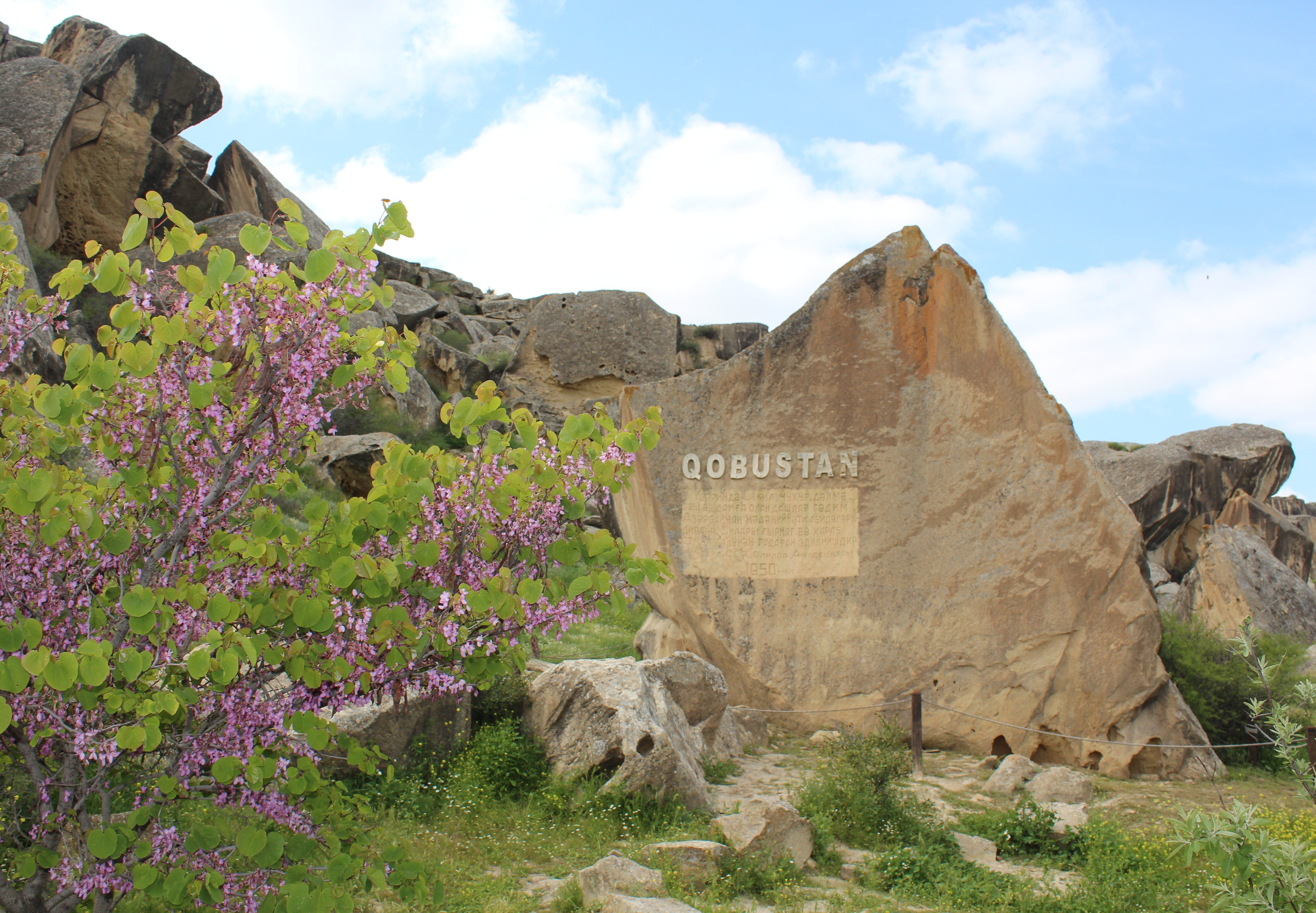
- Entrance to the Gobustan Rock Art Cultural Landscape Reserve

- Location within Azerbaijan
- Location: Azerbaijan
- Includes: 1. Jinghindagh mountain – Yazylytepe hill 2. Boyukdash mountain 3. Kichikdash mountain
- Criteria: Cultural: (iii)
- Reference: 1076rev
- Inscription: 2007 (31st Session)
- Area: 537.22 ha (1,327.5 acres)
- Buffer zone: 3,096.34 ha (7,651.2 acres)
- Coordinates: 40°7′30″N 49°22′30″E

Gobustan State Historical and Cultural Reserve (Azerbaijani: Qobustan dövlət tarixi-bədii qoruğu) is a protected historic and natural site in Azerbaijan, located about 70 kilometres (43 mi) southwest of Baku, near the settlement of Gobustan. It was established to preserve the region's prehistoric rock carvings, mud volcanoes, and natural musical stones.

The reserve encompasses the Gobustan Rock Art Cultural Landscape, which spans 537 hectares and contains over 6,000 rock carvings that depict people, animals, battles, ritual dances, bullfights, boats with armed oarsmen, warriors with lances, camel caravans, and celestial symbols such as the sun and stars, dating back 5,000 to 20,000 years. It also includes the Petroglyph Museum, which has been operating within the reserve since 2011, and the Mud Volcanoes Tourism Complex, inaugurated in 2024.

The area was first declared the Gobustan State Historical Artistic Preserve in 1966 by a decree of the Council of Ministers of the Azerbaijan SSR. In 2007, the Gobustan Rock Art Cultural Landscape was inscribed on the UNESCO World Heritage List. That same year, the site was formally designated a National Reserve by presidential decree and named the Gobustan State Historical and Cultural Reserve.

== Prehistoric carvings ==
The rock carvings and petroglyphs found in the part of the reserve called the Gobustan Rock Art Cultural Landscape show scenes of prehistoric life in the Caucasus. These well-preserved images illustrate ancient populations engaged in activities such as traveling by reed boats, hunting wild animals, and performing dances. The Norwegian anthropologist Thor Heyerdahl visited Azerbaijan multiple times between 1981 and his death in 2002 to study the site as part of his "Search for Odin".

The language of the ancient population of Gobustan remains disputed, yet the petroglyphs provide valuable insights into the lives of prehistoric people who once inhabited the region. Over the course of thousands of years, more than 6,000 depictions of animals, humans, daily life, hunting, and dancing were carved into the rock. Most of these petroglyphs are found on large cliffs, spread across several ancient dwellings, and in some instances, newer images were carved over older ones. Many petroglyphs depict scenes from tribal life, and images found in the Seven Beauties cave suggest that women may have been involved in hunting. The earliest carvings featured naturalistic depictions of human and animal figures, often in irregular forms. Over time the representations became more accurate, with improved attention to proportions and details. The human figures typically have small heads and lack facial features. However, experts do not interpret this absence of facial features as a sign of lack of technical skill, as some carvings display a greater degree of complexity and detail.

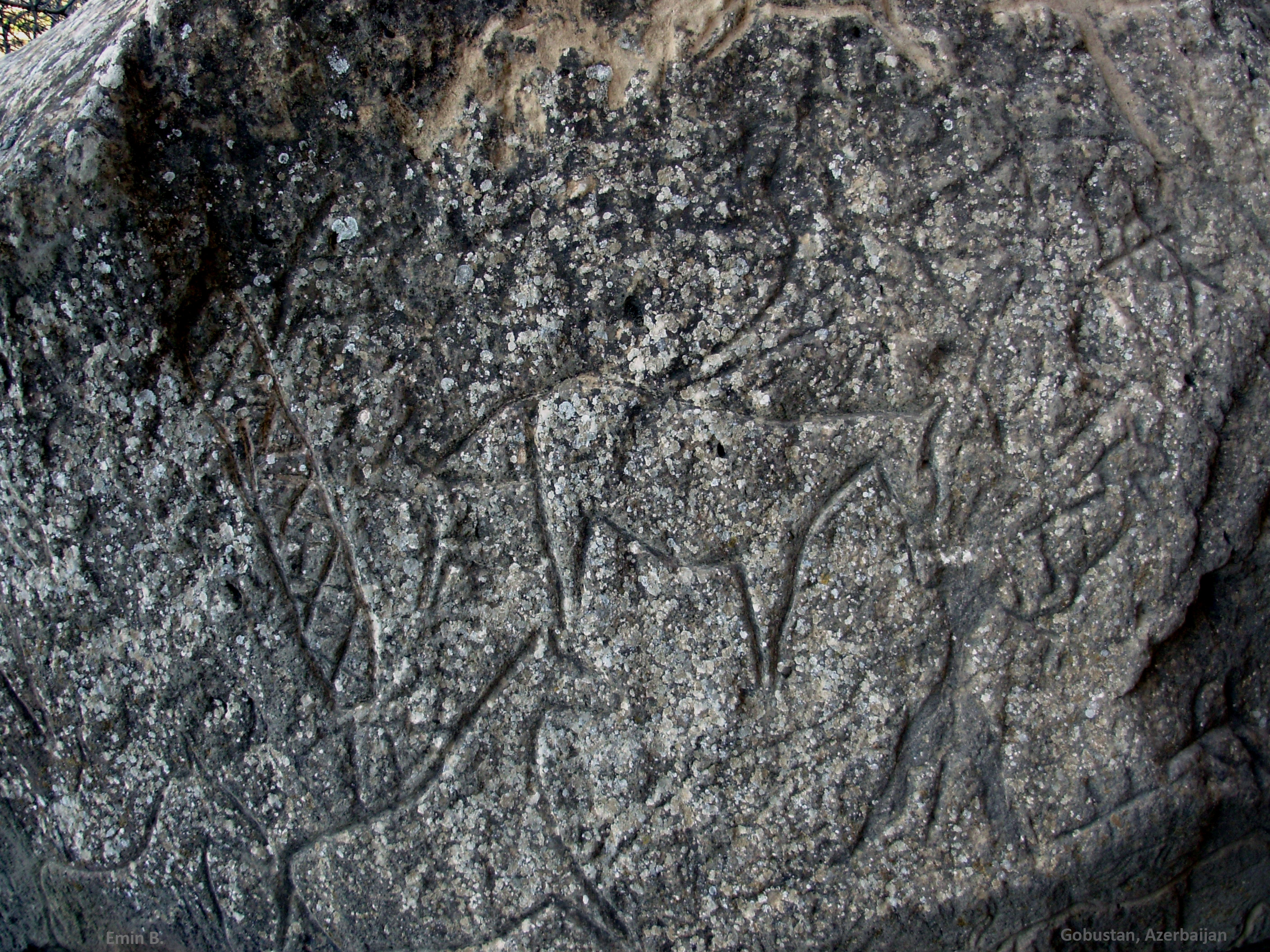

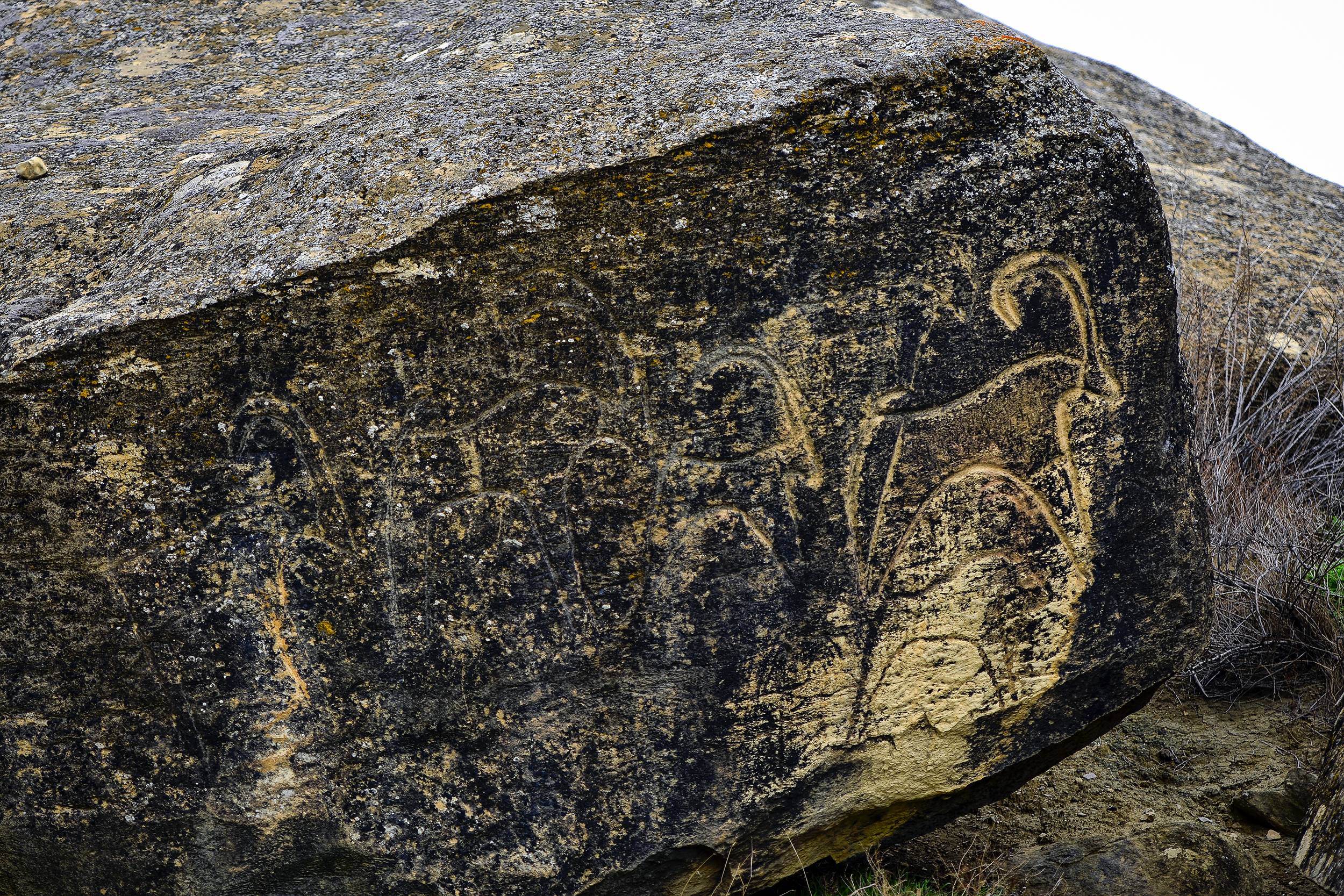

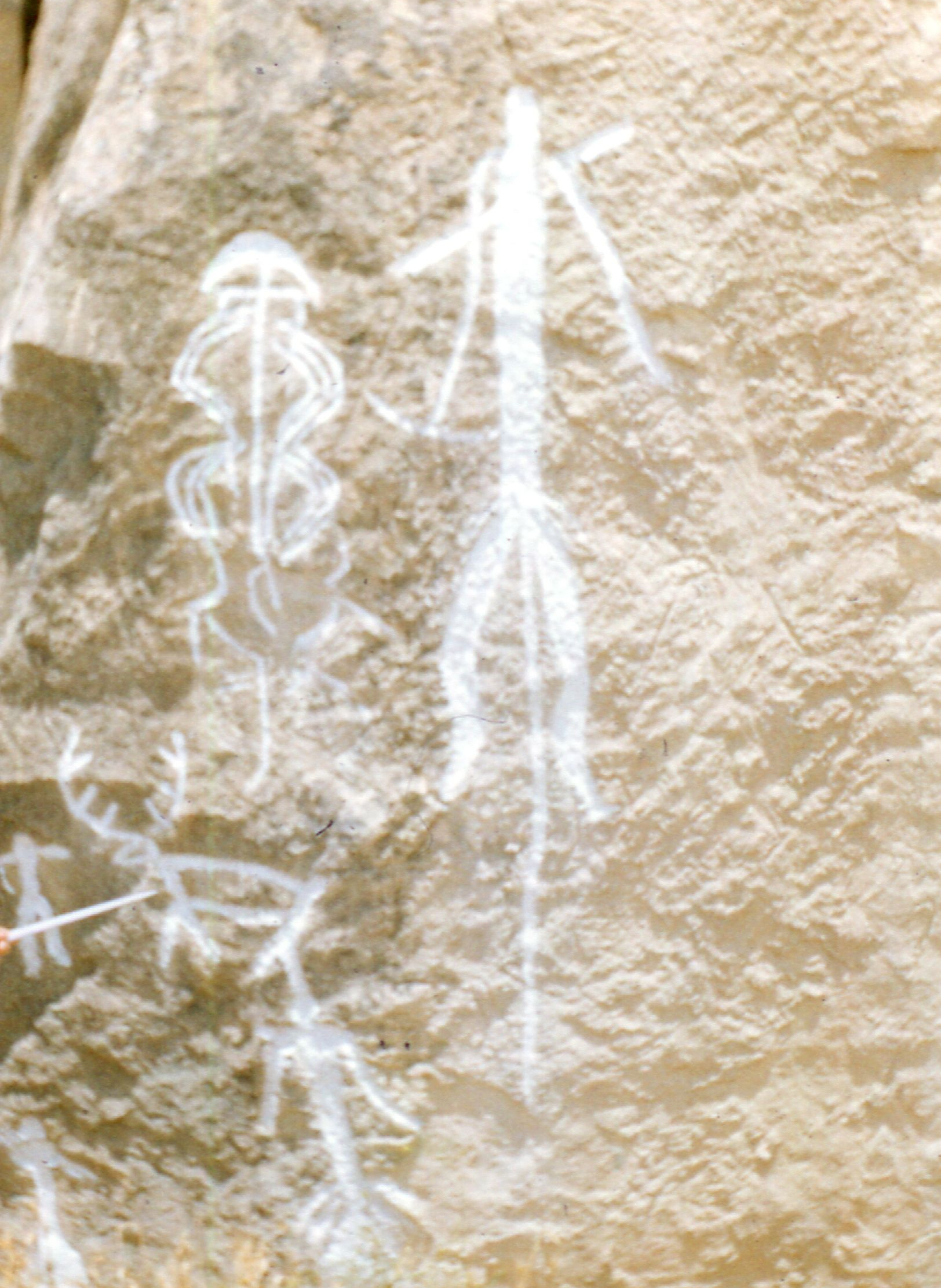

== Roman inscription ==
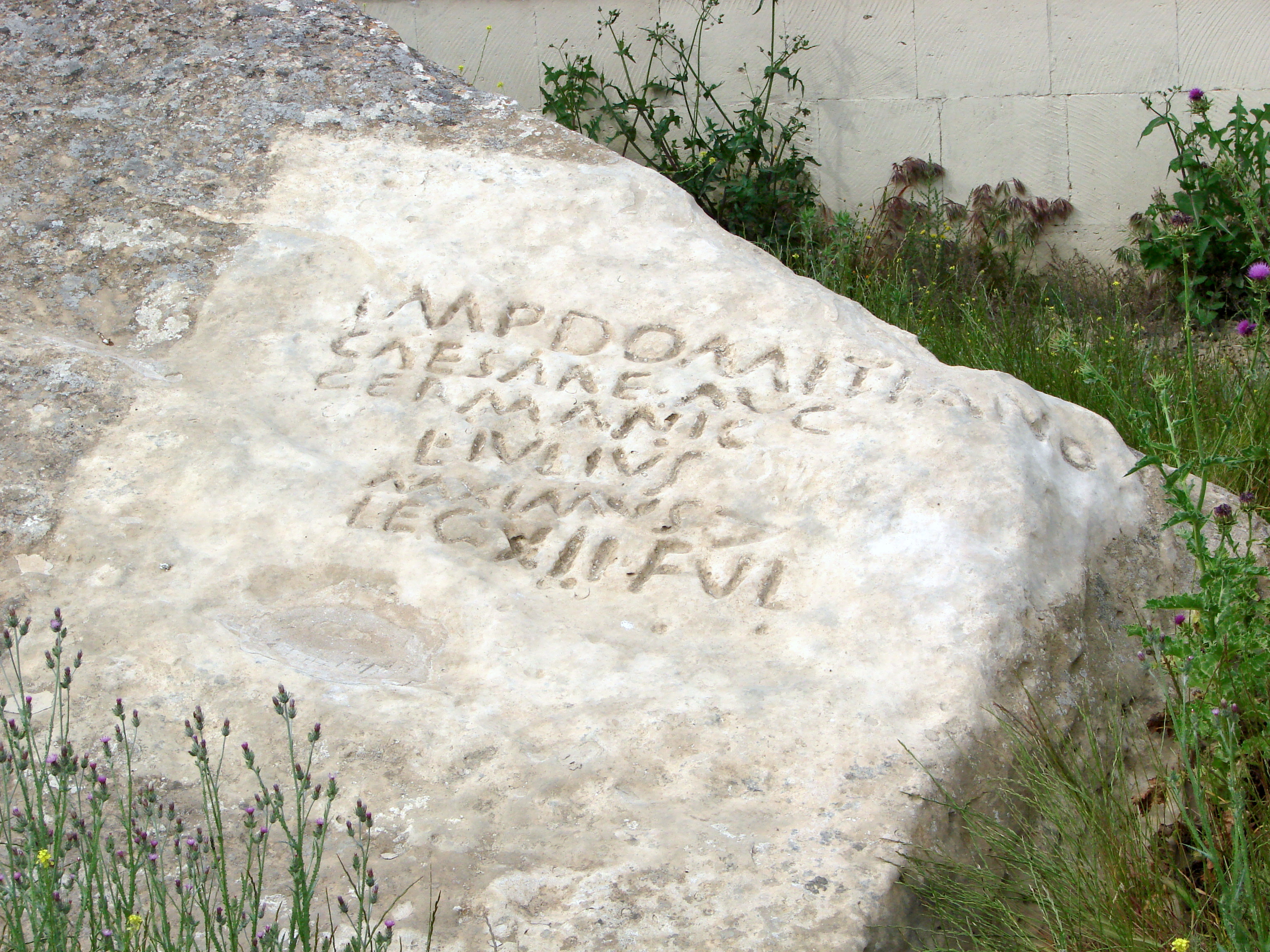
Roman rock inscription "Legio XII Fulminata", carved between 84 and 96 A.D.

In June 1948, Ishag Jafarzadeh, the head of the archaeological expedition from the Institute of History of the Academy of Sciences of the Azerbaijan SSR, discovered a Latin inscription on a large rock near the southeastern slope of Boyuk-Dash mountain, which reads:

IMP DOMITIANO CAESARE AVG GERMANIC, LVCIVS IVLIVS MAXIMVS CENTVRIO LEG XII FVL (To Imp(erator) Domitianus Caesar Aug(ustus) Germanicus, (by) Lucius Julius Maximus, Centurion of Leg(ion) XII Ful(minata).)

Due to its uniqueness and mysteriousness, the inscription attracted the attention of specialists in Latin epigraphy and history of ancient Rome and Transcaucasia. It is the easternmost of all known Latin inscriptions and the only one discovered within the territory of ancient Caucasian Albania. Most experts consider this inscription an indisputable proof of Roman military presence in eastern Transcaucasia in the late 1st century CE. An alternative theory suggests that the inscription might have been left by a Roman centurion who carried out a secret intelligence or diplomatic mission.

== Gaval Dash ==
Gaval Dash is a natural musical stone found exclusively in Gobustan. Located at the entrance to the reserve, it is one of four "singing stones" in the area. When struck with smaller rocks, this large, two-meter-long stone produces a hollow, ringing sound similar to the tambourine, or "gaval" in Azerbaijani. This unique resonance is thought to be caused by microscopic holes within the rock, formed by the region's dry climate and the effect of natural gas.

== Mud volcanoes ==
It is estimated that about 300 of the world's 700 mud volcanoes are located in Gobustan and the Caspian Sea. These volcanoes attract both scientists and tourists, with many visitors bathing in the mud, which is believed to have healing qualities.

In April 2021, a groundbreaking ceremony was held for the new Mud Volcanoes Tourism Complex, which officially opened in June 2024. Covering an area of 12 hectares, the complex features a quad bike path, footpaths, a zip line, an observation tower, a parking lot, a souvenir shop, and therapeutic baths. The road infrastructure was upgraded with the extension of a 20-kilometer road from the Gobustan Reserve to the Gilinj mud volcano site and nearby volcanoes, creating the Baku-Gobustan-Mud Volcanoes tourism cluster. The Complex includes a Nature History Exhibition Hall showcasing a collection of animal skeletons from Azerbaijan and around the world, as well as a mineral exhibition featuring nearly 80 types of minerals found in Azerbaijan. There is also a 110-seat restaurant within the complex.

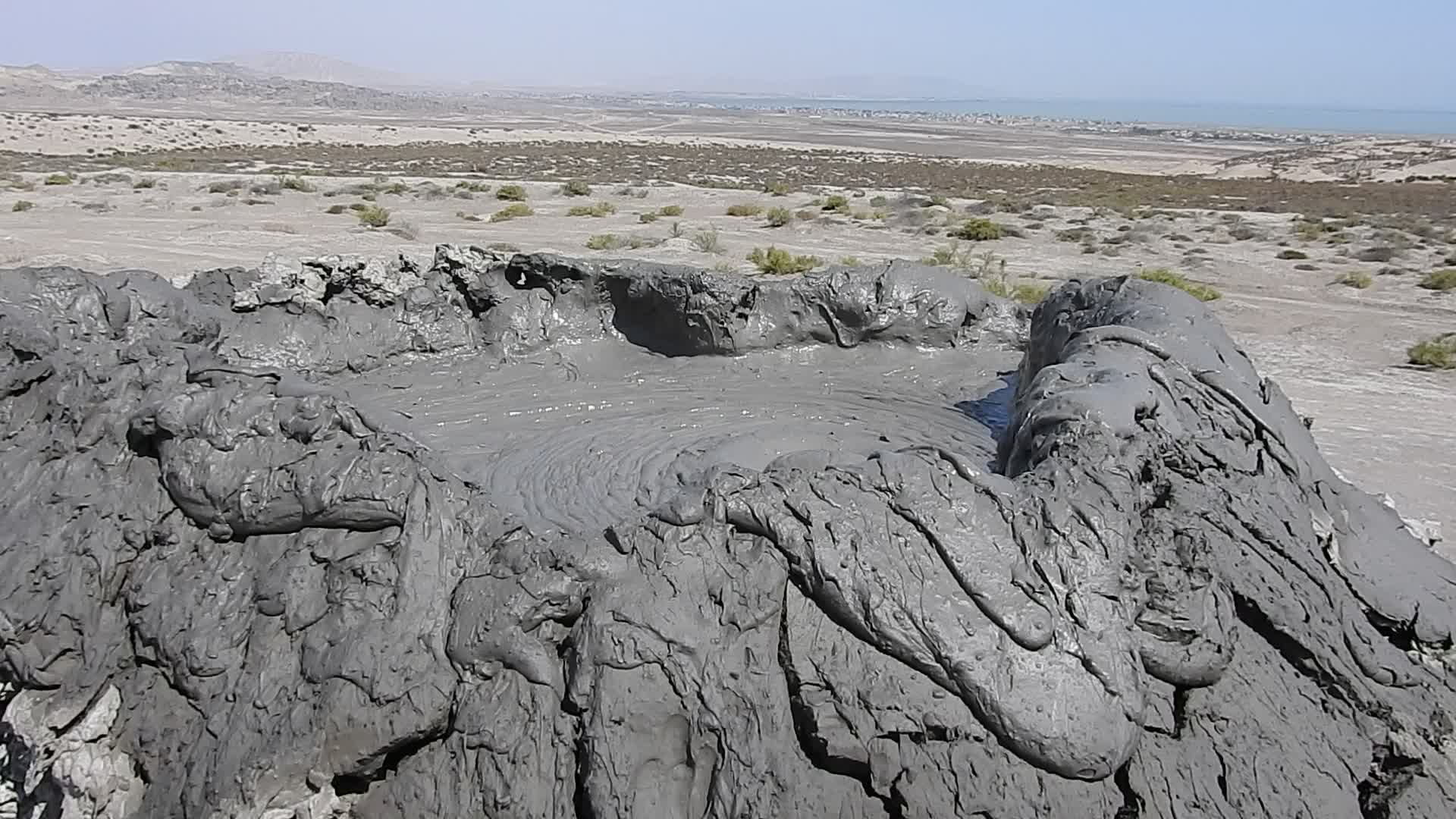

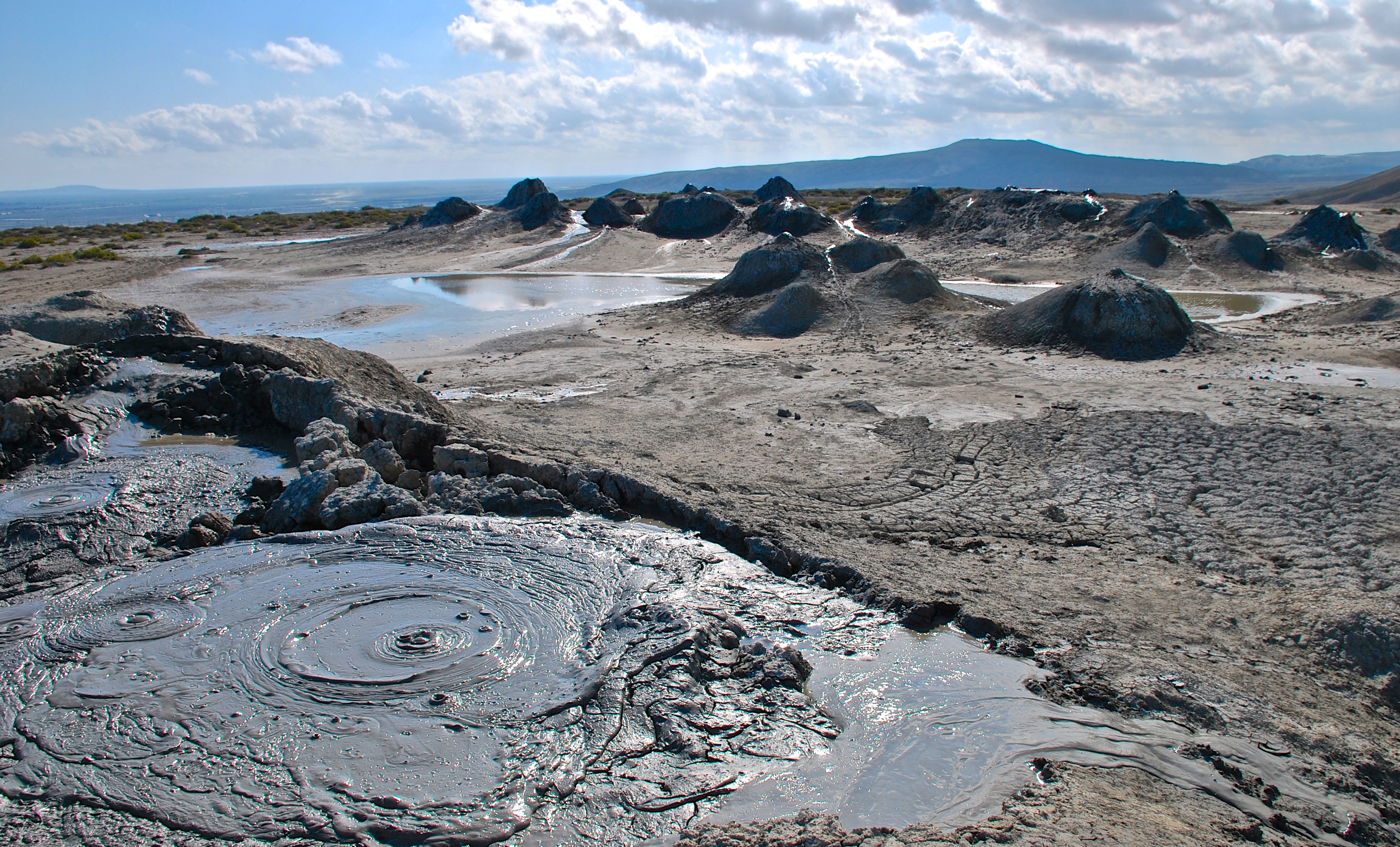

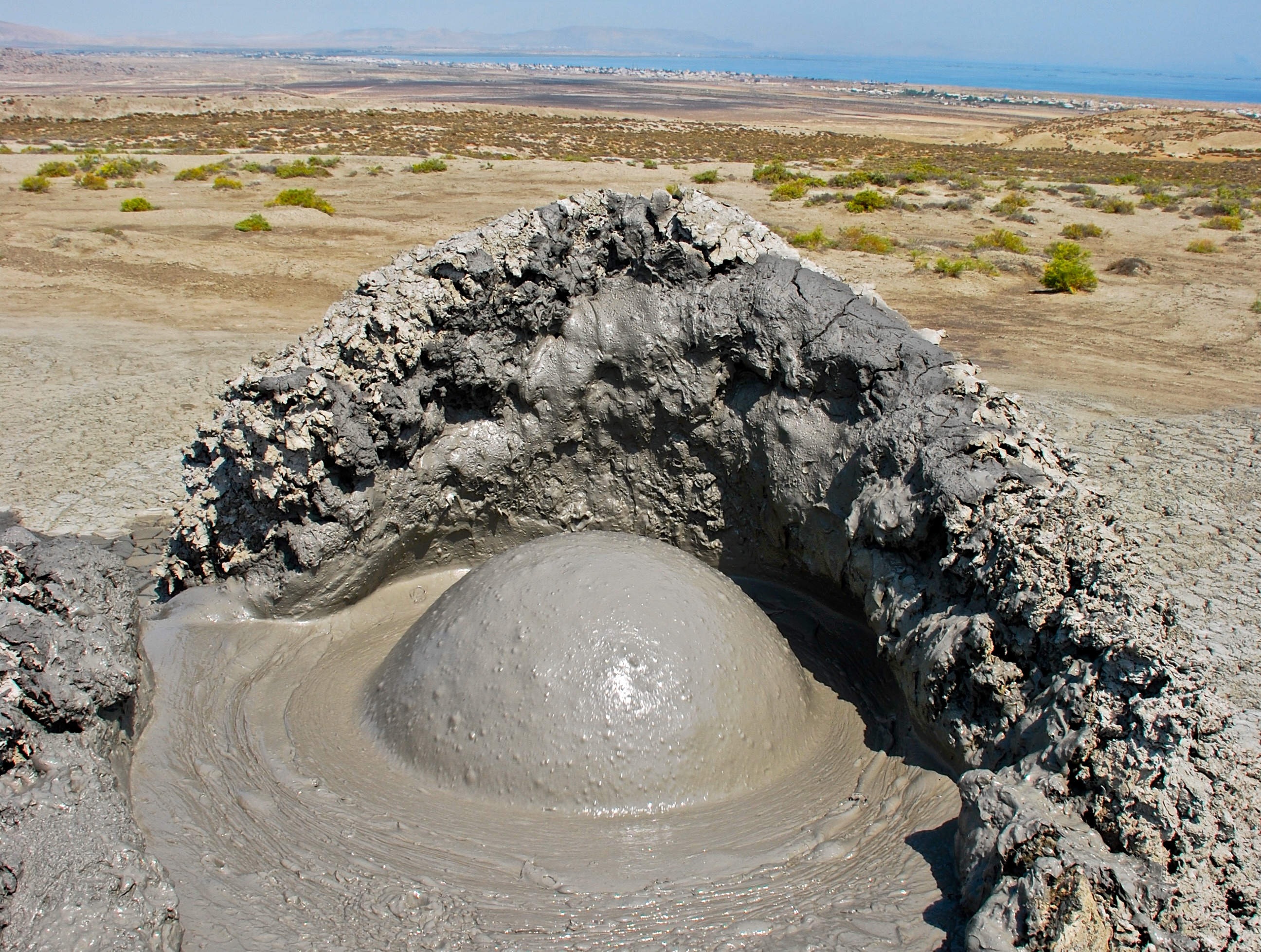

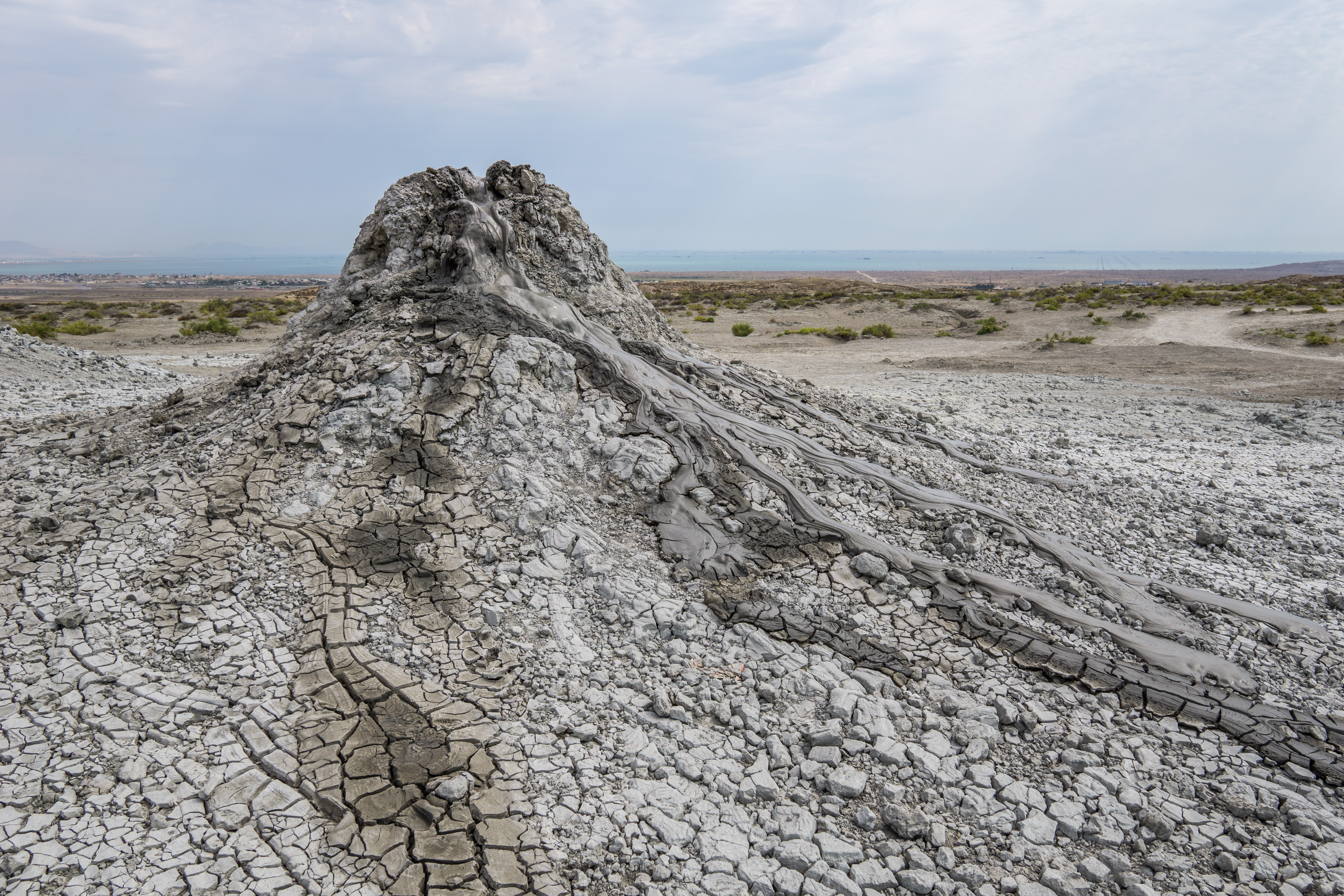

== Flora and fauna ==
The natural conditions of the region were vastly different 20,000 to 25,000 years ago. Depictions of wildlife and humans in Gobustan indicate that around 10,000 to 12,000 years ago, the region enjoyed a much wetter climate, marked by frequent rainfall and abundant springs. People wore light clothing, with women dressed in short leather garments. Due to the permanently hot weather, abundant vegetation, and plentiful water, Gobustan was home to wild animals such as bulls, horses, deer, and goats. Rock carvings and archaeological evidence also suggest the presence of wolves, tigers, foxes, jackals, and other wildlife in the area.

In 1968, the bones of an unknown large animal were discovered 3 metres (9.8 ft) underground during excavation work near Atbulaq. The workers notified the Ministry of Culture of the Azerbaijan SSR. Upon examination, it was determined that the bones were the cervical vertebrae of the southern mammoth that once inhabited Gobustan.

Today, Gobustan's desert and semi-desert landscape, with its sparse grasses, shrubs, and scattered wild plants like rose, juniper, and pomegranate, reflects a much drier environment than in ancient times. Its once-rich wildlife has greatly diminished, now limited to species such as foxes, jackals, wolves, hares, wild cats, and reptiles.

== See also ==
- Nature of Azerbaijan
- National Parks of Azerbaijan
- State Reserves of Azerbaijan
- State Game Reserves of Azerbaijan
- Zoroastrianism in Azerbaijan
- Gobustan District
- Ramana, Azerbaijan
- Khinalyg
- Yanar Dag
- Fire Temple of Baku
