= Institute of History of Azerbaijan National Academy of Sciences =

Facility in Baku, Azerbaijan

Institute of History and Ethnology of Azerbaijan National Academy of Sciences
- Parent institution: Azerbaijan National Academy of Sciences
- Head: Karim Shukurov
- Address: Baku, H. Cavid pr., 115 AZ 1143
- Location: Azerbaijan
- Website: http://tarixinstitutu.az/

The Institute of History and Ethnology named after Abbasgulu Bakikhanov of Azerbaijan National Academy of Sciences is a scientific research institute affiliated with ANAS.

== History ==
Azerbaijan National Academy of Sciences of History and Ethnology Institute was established in 1935 as an independent History, Archeology and Ethnography Institute which was subject to Azerbaijani Branch of the USSR Academy of Sciences. The institute has been operating since 1936. Within the structure of USSR Academy of Sciences’ Azerbaijani branch, the institute started function as a separate scientific research institution since 1940. When the Azerbaijan SSR Academy of Sciences was organized in 1945 the History Institute was incorporated into its structure as an independent scientific institution. Later, in 1951, the Institute of History was transformed into the Institute of History and Philosophy of the Academy of Sciences of the Azerbaijan SSR and in 1956, after the creation of the Philosophy Sector affiliated with EA of Azerbaijan, it again began to function as an independent institute. In 1974, the Archeology and Ethnography Sector was established which initially operated as dependent bodies on History Institute, but since 1993, it has become a body.

== Heads of the institute ==
The Institute of History and Ethnology named after Abbasgulu Bakikhanov of Azerbaijan National Academy of Sciences has been headed by the following scientists:

- Meshchaninov Ivan Ivanovich (1936–1937)
- Ziffeld-Simumyagi Arthur Rudolfovich (8 May 1937 – 1 June 1937)
- Ahmadov Ahmad Ali oglu (1 June 1937 – 11 July 1937)
- Hasanov Idris Meshedi Zaman oglu (19 July 1937 – 17 February 1938)
- Kozin Yakov Dmitriyevich (9 January 1940 – 28 October 1940)
- Klimov Aleksey Alekseyevich (17 February 1938 – 1 January 1939 (1)/ 29 October 1940 – 10 April 1941 (2))
- Huseynov Ismayil Abbas oglu (10 April 1941 – 25 February 1944)
- Alizadeh Abdulkarim Ali oglu (25 February 1944 – 16 June 1950)
- Sharifli Mammadali Khalil oglu (16 June 1950 – 16 February 1951)
- Quliyev Aliovset Najafqulu oglu (5 April 1953 - 16 January 1958 (1) / 6 June 1967 – 6 November 1969 (2))
- Ibrahimov Zulfali Imamali oglu (12 November 1960 – 6 June 1967)
- Sumbatzadeh Alisohbet Sumbat oglu (16 April 1970 – 24 March 1972)
- Quliyev Jamil Bahadur oglu (27 March 1972 – 17 January 1978)
- Aliyev Igrar Hebib oglu (17 January 1978 – 11 June 2004)
- Mahmudov Yagub Mikayil oglu (13 September 2004 – 22 January 2021)
- Shukurov Karim Karam oglu (since 28 January 2021)

== Objectives ==
The History Institute affiliated with ANAS (Azerbaijan National Academy of Sciences) aims to analyze the history of the Republic of Azerbaijan. The institute has 4 directions; to conduct general scientific researches on history of Azerbaijan, historiography and source study on Azerbaijan history, political history of Azerbaijan, and the social and economic history of Azerbaijan.

== Structure ==
The structure of the Institute of History named after A.A. Bakikhanov of ANAS includes management, scientific research departments and other departments.

=== Management ===
- Director
- Deputy director for scientific affairs
- Scientific Secretary
- Deputy director for general affairs

=== Scientific research departments ===
- "Aliyev studies" department
- "Theory of history, source studies and historiography" department
- "Source studies and historiography" department
- "Ancient history" department
- "History of Atropatena and Albania (Caucasus)" department
- "History of 7th-14th centuries of Azerbaijan" department
- "History of XV-XVIII centuries of Azerbaijan" department
- "History of Northern Azerbaijan at the beginning of the 19th-20th centuries" department
- "History of the Azerbaijan People's Republic" department
- "Soviet period history of Azerbaijan" department
- "History of the Republic of Azerbaijan" department
- "History of Western Azerbaijan" department
- "History of international relations of Azerbaijan" department
- "World history" department
- "Ethnography of Turkish peoples" department
- "Historical ethnography" department
- "Modern period ethnography" department

=== Other departments ===
- Human Resources department
- Department of education
- Department of international relations
- Public relations department
- Department of work with documents
- Supply and service department
- Department of scientific information and publishing works

== Collaborating organizations ==
- Chakha Akhriev Research Institute of the Humanities of the Republic of Ingushetia
- T.M.Kerashev Institute of Humanitarian Studies of the Republic of Adygea
- Maikop State Technological University of the Republic of Adygea
- Institute of History, Archeology and Ethnography of the Dagestan Scientific Center
- Autonomous Non-Commercial Organization of the RF the “Institute of History, Economics and Law”
- Peter the Great Museum of Anthropology and Ethnography (Kunstkamera)
- Sh. Mardzhani Institute of History of the Academy of Sciences of the Republic of Tatarstan

== See also ==
- Azerbaijan National Academy of Sciences
