= Gobustan Rock Art Cultural Landscape =

UNESCO World Heritage Site
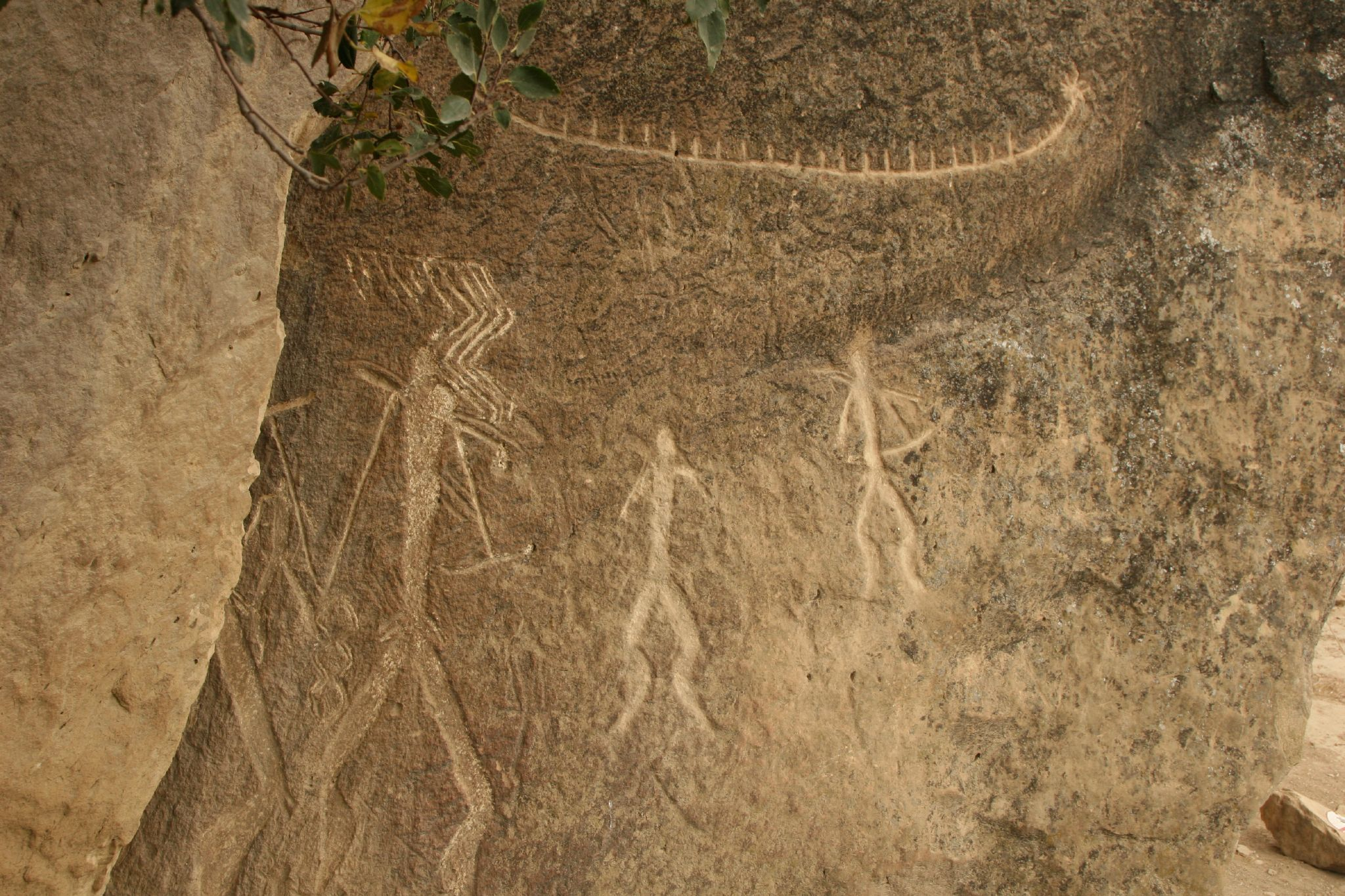
- Petroglyphs on rock in Gobustan
- Interactive map of Gobustan Rock Art Cultural Landscape
- Location: Azerbaijan
- Criteria: iii
- Reference: 1076
- Inscription: 2007 (31st Session)

The Gobustan Rock Art Cultural Landscape is a historic site in Azerbaijan, comprising a large collection of petroglyphs that reflect the flora, fauna, hunting practices, social structures, and cultural expressions of human societies from prehistoric to medieval times. These engravings provide detailed depictions of anthropomorphic figures, such as lance-bearers and ritualistic dance scenes, as well as various animal species, bullfighting events, camel caravans, and celestial symbols such as the sun and other stars. Estimated to date back approximately 5,000 to 20,000 years, the rock art offers insight into the spiritual life and daily activities of early human populations in the region. It is recognized as a UNESCO World Heritage Site and forms part of the larger Gobustan State Historical and Cultural Reserve, which preserves archaeological, cultural, and natural landmarks.

== Rock carvings and petroglyphs ==
The Gobustan Rock Art Cultural Landscape reflects the history of human development in Eurasia from the Upper Paleolithic era through the Middle Ages. It is situated at the southeastern end of the Greater Caucasus ridge, approximately 70 km (43 mi) southwest of central Baku, and covers an area of 537 hectares.

The protected area comprises three rocky highlands located in the semi-arid zone of central Azerbaijan. It contains over 6,000 petroglyphs carved into more than 1,000 rock surfaces, representing 40,000 years of rock art history.

During the archaeological excavations, 104 small engraved stones were also discovered across different stratigraphic layers.

Petroglyphs in Gobustan, dating back approximately 5,000 to 8,000 years, include depictions of longships that closely resemble Viking ships. The presence of these ship depictions among the rock carvings suggests possible cultural connections or maritime interactions between the inhabitants of the region and those of the Mediterranean and other European regions.

Located in the Gobustan region, the Jingirdag, Boyukdash, and Kichikdash mountains, along with Yazili Hill, contain various forms of ancient rock art. Most of the carvings are concentrated on the upper surfaces of the Boyukdash and Kichikdash mountains. These rock engravings, dating back approximately 3,000 to 4,000 years, predominantly depict hunting scenes. Human figures such as dancers, hunters, and men wearing tropical-style helmets, as well as animals such as deer and goats, are depicted on the more sheltered faces of the rock formations.

The animal images carved on the rocks of Gobustan vary across different periods, reflecting shifts in hunting targets influenced by climatic changes. During the Pleistocene, large game such as aurochs and wild horses predominated, whereas in the Holocene period, depictions shifted to relatively smaller animals such as deer, wild boar, and birds, corresponding to environmental transformations at the onset of the Holocene. The sticky drawings of the deer, goat and cattle dated between 12th and 8th centuries BC reflect the Neolithic period in Gobustan.

One of the rocks bears a Latin inscription dating to the reign of Roman Emperor Domitian (81–96 AD), indicating the temporary presence of the Roman Legion XII Fulminata on the shores of the Caspian Sea.

Another relic from early times is the so-called Gaval Dash (tambourine stone), a prehistoric musical instrument.

== History ==
The rock art was accidentally discovered by quarry workers in the 1930s. Following initial archaeological research led by Ishag Jafarzadeh in 1939, scholars from the Institute of History of Azerbaijan National Academy of Sciences identified and studied over 6,000 rock carvings, settlements, and burial sites dating from the Upper Paleolithic to the Middle Ages. Jafarzadeh analyzed approximately 750 rocks bearing more than 3,500 petroglyphs, which he classified into six chronological periods ranging from ancient times to the Middle Ages:

- Neolithic Period: Depictions of men and women, often shown carrying bows and arrows on their shoulders.
- Late Neolithic Period: Depictions of bison, boats, and archers.
- Eneolithic Period: Large-scale depictions of goats, lions, and deer.
- Bronze Age Period: Depictions of wild animals, horses, and pigs.
- Iron Age Period: Depictions of human figures, goats, and deer, as well as a Roman inscription.
- Middle Ages: Depictions of camel caravans, weapon-wielding warriors, various symbols, and inscriptions in Arabic and Persian.

Subsequent discoveries by F. Muradova and J. Rustamov revealed over 1,500 additional petroglyphs. During archaeological excavations, numerous Bronze Age structures were uncovered at the site.

The area was declared the Gobustan State Historical Artistic Preserve in 1966 by a decree of the Council of Ministers of the Azerbaijan SSR. The Gobustan State Historical and Cultural Reserve was established in 2007 by a presidential decree. The same year, Gobustan Rock Art Cultural Landscape was designated a UNESCO World Heritage Site.

== Gallery ==
Petroglyphs on rocks in Gobustan

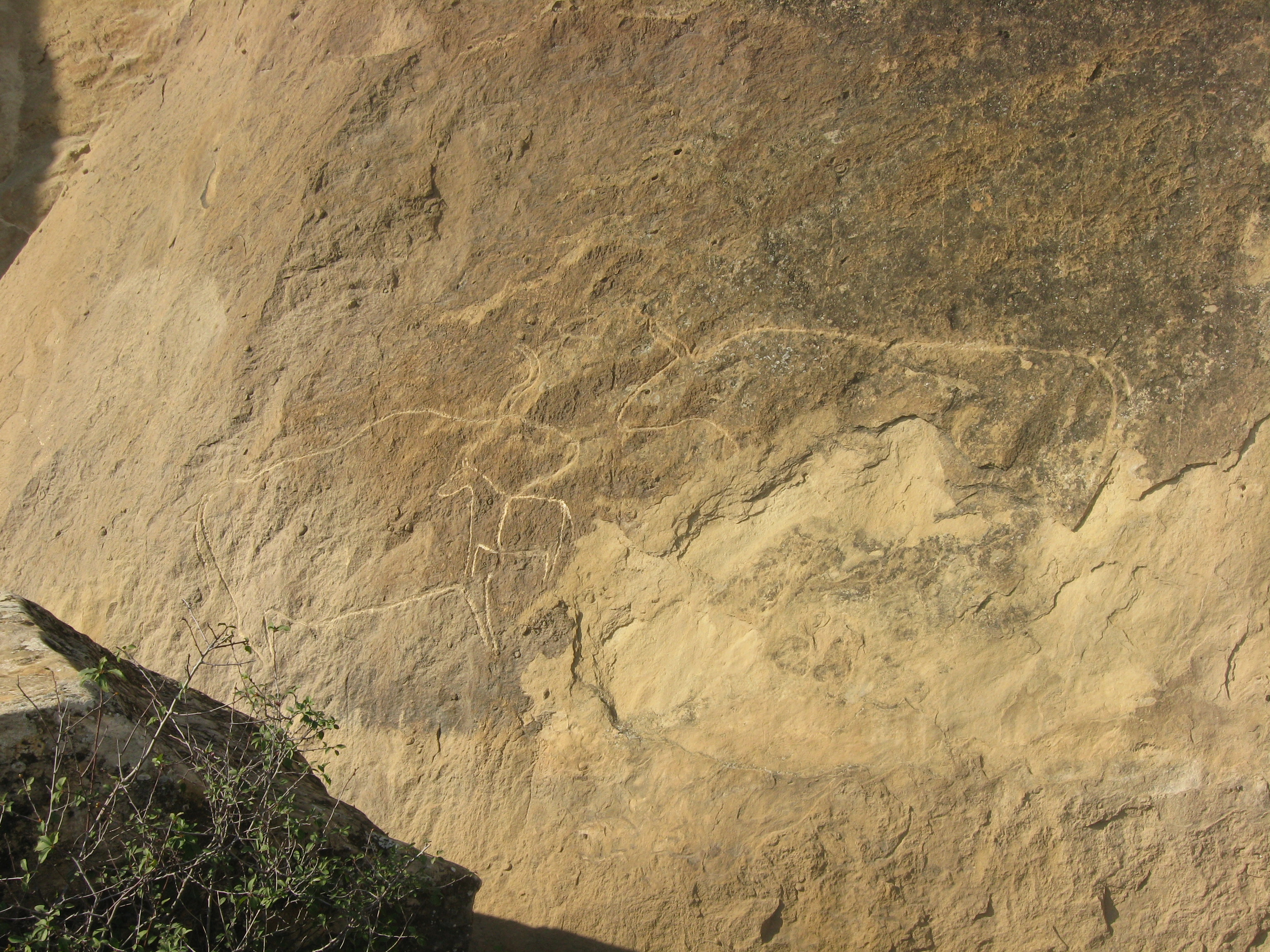

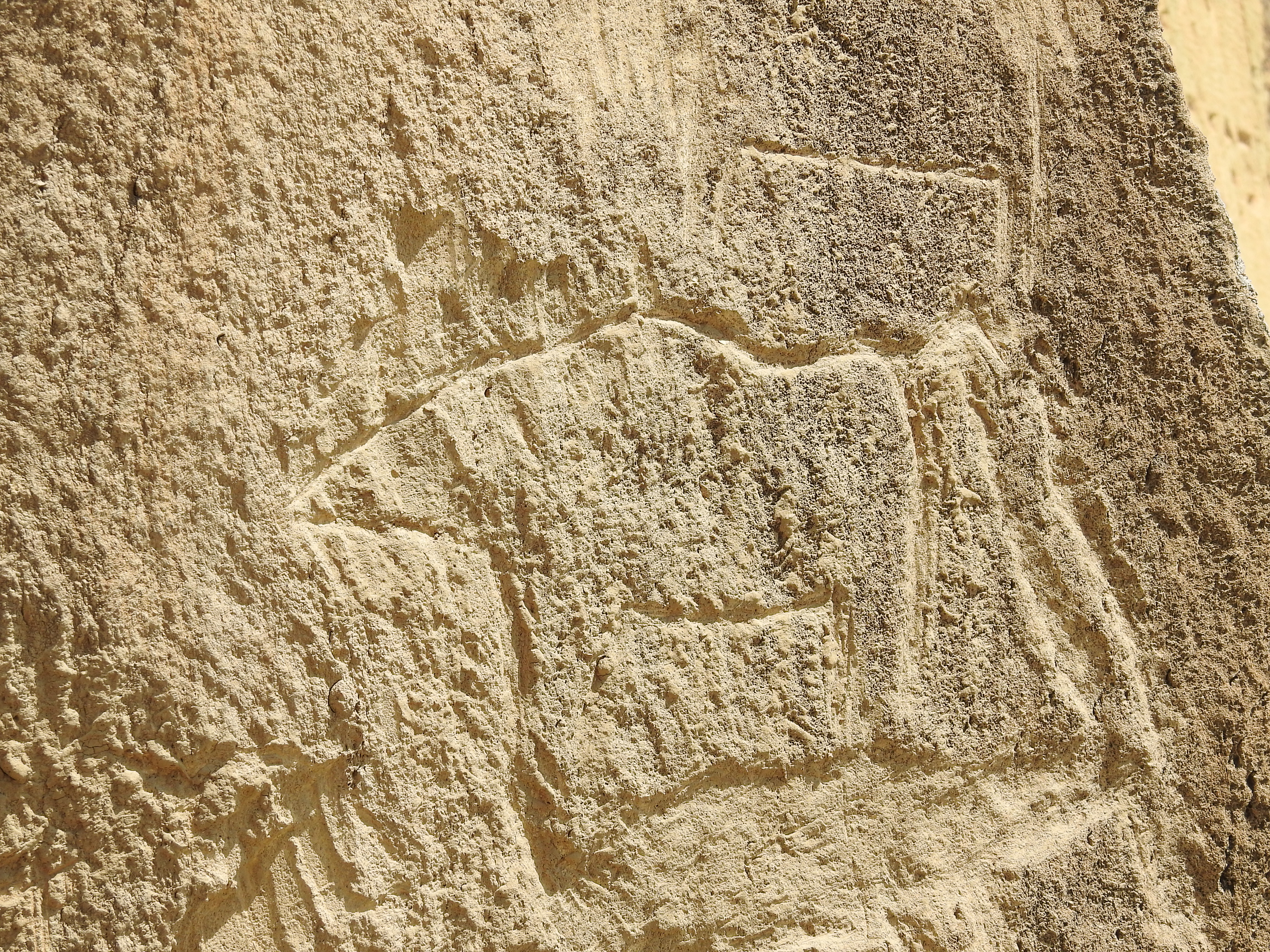

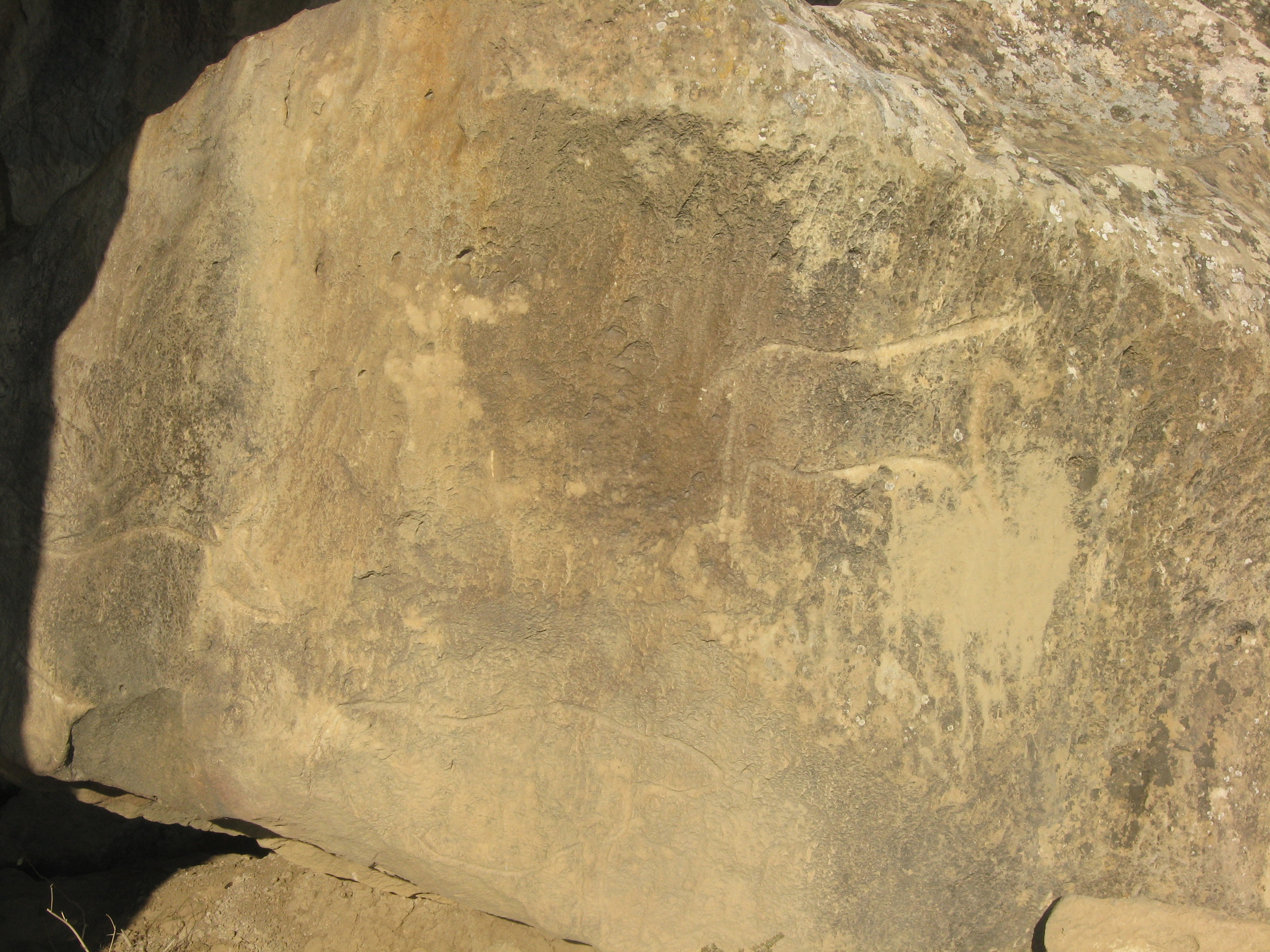

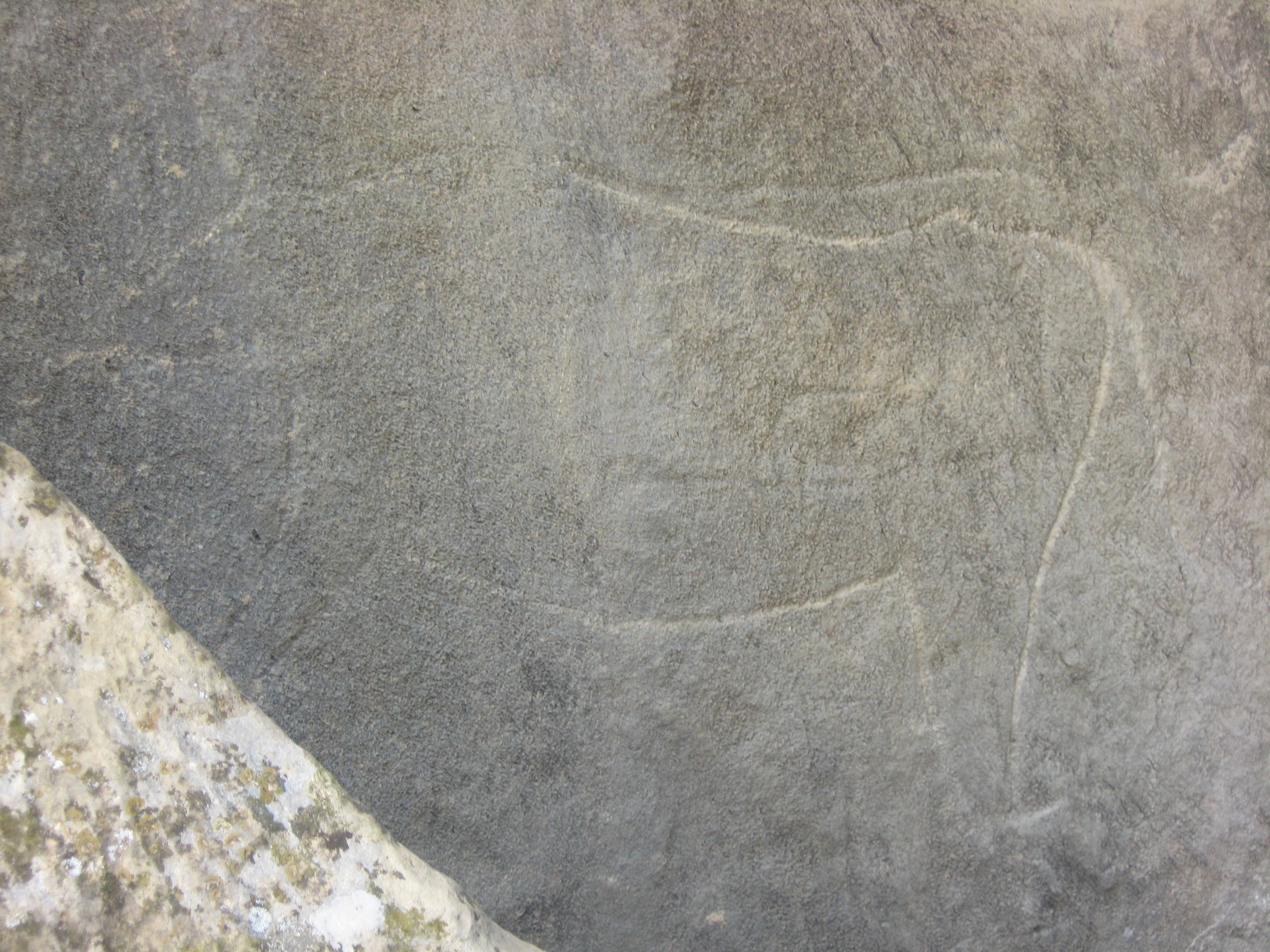

== See also ==
- Gobustan District
- Gobustan State Historical and Cultural Reserve
- World Heritage Site
