= Abbasgulu Bakikhanov =

Azerbaijani writer, historian, journalist, linguist, poet and philosopher

- Abbasqulu Bakıxanov
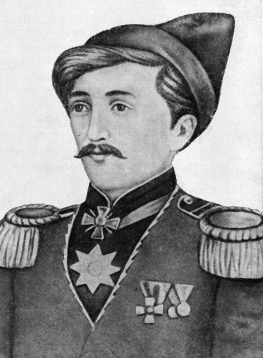
- Born: 21 June [O.S. 3 July] 1794; Amirjan, Baku Khanate, Qajar Iran
- Died: January 1847 (aged 52–53); Wadi Fatimah, Jeddah, Ottoman Empire
- Other name: Qodsi (pen name)
- Occupations: writer, historian, journalist, linguist, poet and philosopher
- Known for: Father of Azerbaijani historiography
- Father: Mirza Muhammad Khan II
- Family: Bakikhanovs

Abbasgulu agha Bakikhanov (Note: "Bakikhanov" derives from "Baku-Khanov". A Russified name.) (Azerbaijani: Abbasqulu ağa Bakıxanov) (21 June [O.S. 3 July] 1794, – January 1847), Abbas Qoli Bakikhanov, (Note: Or "Abbas Qoli Aqa Bakikhanov".) or Abbas-Qoli ibn Mirza Mohammad (Taghi) Khan Badkubi, also known by his pen name Qodsi (Azerbaijani: Qüdsi), was an Azerbaijani writer, historian, journalist, linguist, poet and philosopher. He was the son of the third khan of Baku, Mirza Muhammad Khan II. He served as an officer in the Imperial Russian Army and participated in the Russo-Persian War of 1826–1828. He later retired and settled in Quba.

Many Azerbaijani scholars view Bakikhanov as among their first thinkers and historians. He is credited with writing the first scholarly monograph about the history of greater Shirvan, i.e., the area that would later make up most of the Republic of Azerbaijan. His Qanun-e Qodsi was one of the first grammars of the Persian language.

== Early life ==
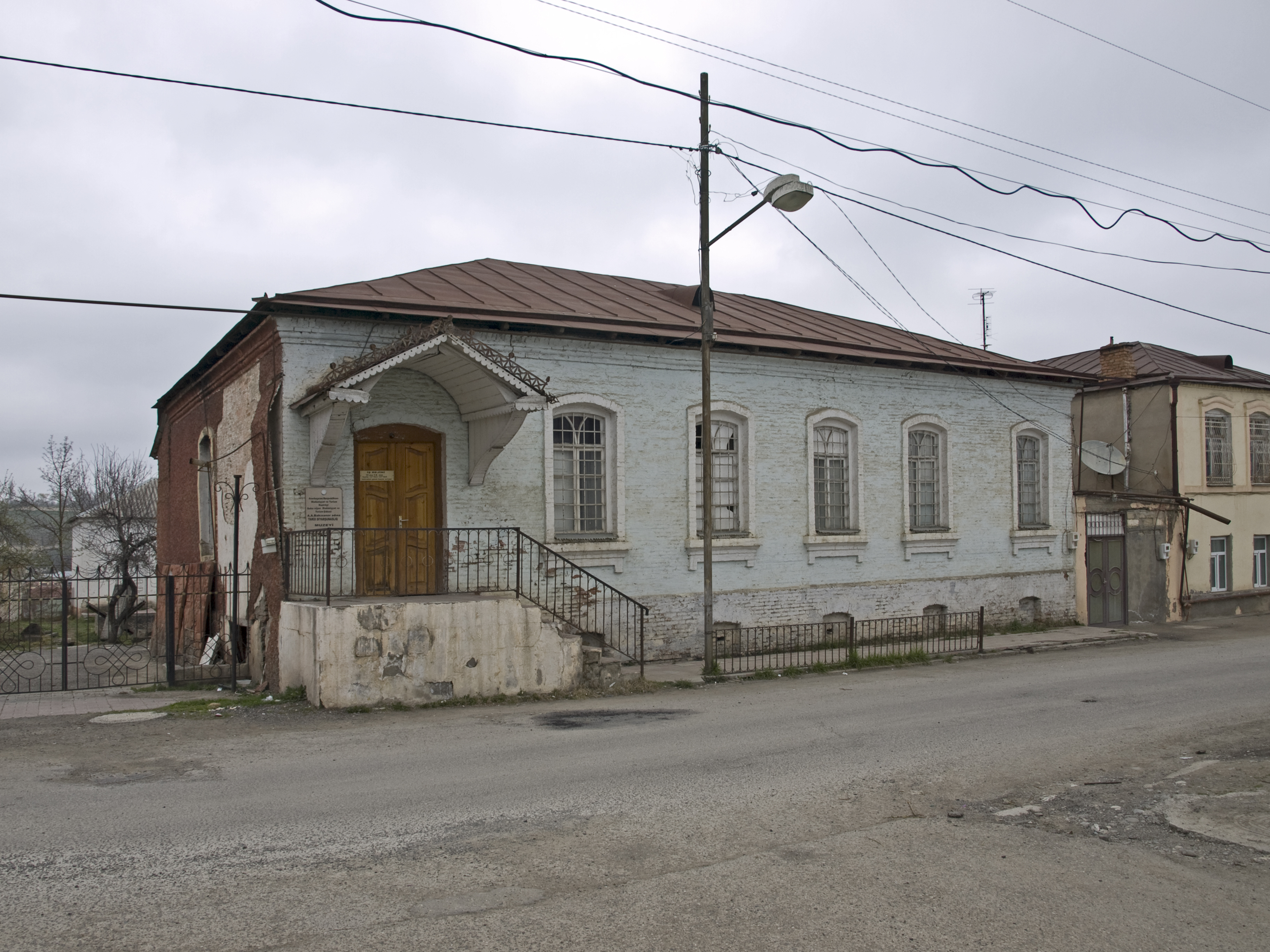
Bakikhanov's house-museum in Amsar, Quba.

Bakikhanov was born in Amirjan to Mirza Muhammad Khan II, the third khan of Baku, and a Georgian woman named Sofia. He began his education in 1801 and was taught in Persian by several mullahs of his time, like Muhammad Bakuvi and Haji Muhammad Gulkhani (d. 1808). In 1813, seven years after the loss of the khanate's sovereignty, his family moved to Quba, where over the next ten years he learned Arabic, Turkish, and Russian, followed later by French and Polish. In 1818, he established the first Azeri literary society, Gulistan-i Iram.

He enlisted in the Russian army on 20 December 1819 [O.S. 1 January 1820] and began serving as an interpreter for the Caucasus Viceroyalty office in Tiflis on 28 December 1821 [O.S. 9 January 1822]. He worked in this position for 25 years.

== Career ==
Bakikhanov took an active part in campaigns against rebellious Dagestani principalities. He was also a member of the Russian diplomatic mission in charge of negotiating border issues between Russia and Persia in the 1820s. In 1823 he helped gather ethnographic information for the Description of the Province of Karabakh. In 1828, he was among the Russian military command under General Paskevich that took part in peace negotiations with Persia, which resulted in signing the Treaty of Turkmenchay. He convinced Khan Ehsan of Nakhchivan, as well as a number of Kurdish leaders of Persia, to ally with Russia. In 1829 he was awarded the 4th Degree Medal of St. Vladimir for participating in the siege of Kars in the Russo-Turkish War of 1828-1829. He met Alexander Pushkin in Erzurum in 1829, acting as his interpreter. During this time, he also established friendly relations with General Nikita Pankratiev as well as Dmitry Bibikov, then Minister of Internal Affairs.

He was tasked with cataloging seized books from Ottoman libraries from Akhaltsikhe, Erzurum and Bayazet. During this time he also found and translated Derbendname (Book of Derbent) by Mulla Muhammad Rafi.

Dissatisfied with viceroy Georg Andreas von Rosen who questioned his loyalty, he decided to leave military service and tried to seek a career in Russian Ministry of Foreign Affairs. He traveled to Warsaw in 1833 to meet and get support from his former superior Ivan Paskevich, who was now serving as viceroy of Congress Poland. Here, he complained about the treatment of Caucasian Muslims by Yermolov and Rosen and sent a protest note. He eventually made it to Saint Petersburg after receiving news from Karl Nesselrode in May 1834 but left only two months later, reportedly under pressure of Rosen.

He retired in 1835 and returned to the village of Amsar near Quba. He continued to write for several newspapers, including Tiflisskiye vedomosti. In 1837 he was summoned to Tiflis for the investigative committee on Quba revolt. He wrote the article on the Wahhabis at the request of the mujtahid of Tiflis for Entsiklopedichesky leksikon, the first Russian encyclopedia, in 1839.

He was recalled to military duty in 1842 by Yevgeny Golovin, then Commander-in-Chief in the Caucasus and was promoted to the rank of colonel.

== Educational efforts ==
Bakikhanov's religious views were generally liberal due to major European influences. He criticized fanaticism among the religious masses and the Obscurantism of the clergy. He promoted the Islamic culture in the region and in Russia as a whole. His ultimate goal was to establish a Muslim college in Baku and an Oriental languages school in Tbilisi. In 1832 he came up with a project for establishing a major educational institution for Muslims, where subjects would be taught in Russian, Persian, and Azeri. He went further, and wrote a number of textbooks through which students were expected to study. The project was sent to the governor of the Caucasus for approval but was disregarded. Bakikhanov also translated several fables by Ivan Krylov into Azeri, one of which survives. His greatest accomplishment in the field of education was writing Qanun-e Qodsi, one of the first grammars of the Persian language.

== Later years ==
In 1845 Bakikhanov went on a hajj. On his way to the holy Islamic sights, he was warmly received by Mohammad Shah Qajar and was awarded the Shir-e Khorshid, the highest-ranking Persian medal, for the second time. There he also visited Isfahan, Yazd, Shiraz, and Kermanshah. From there he changed his route to Ottoman Empire on the suggestion of Moisey Argutinsky-Dolgorukov, who was stationed in Qajar Iran at the time. In Constantinople, Bakikhanov had an audience with Abdulmejid I in October 1846, who showed interest in some of his academic writings, particularly in Asrar al-Malakut, of which he was presented a copy. It was reported by Allgemeine Zeitung that this meeting also had a diplomatic character as it was for the first time a Muslim was representing a non-Muslim country. From there, Bakikhanov went to visit Alexandria, Cairo, Mecca and Medina. On his way from Medina back to Damascus he caught cholera and died in the small town of Wadi Fatimah in Hejaz (present-day Saudi Arabia) in 1847. His exact time of death or burial site has not been established, but his death was reported on 2 February 1847 by the Russian consul in Syria to Mikhail Ustinov, Russian ambassador to Ottoman Empire.

== Works ==
=== Major ===
- Riyadh al-Quds (The Holy Garden, 1820). Bakikhanov wrote his first book (in Azerbaijani) under religious influence from the Muslim communities of Quba. At the same time, Riyadh al-Quds was Bakikhanov's reflection piece on Shi'a mystic literature, such as Jila al-Uyun by Mohammed Baqer Majlisi.
- Mishkat al-Anwar (The Cresset Niche, 1829) is an almanac of fables, parables, as well as some quotes from the Qur'an and references to Sufi mysticism overall aimed at preserving social values and morals within society. The book was written in Persian.
- Kashf al-Qaraib (The Discovery of the Unknown, 1830) was one of the school books written by Bakikhanov in 1830 in Persian, where he describes the discovery of the Americas.
- Qanun-e Qodsi (The Holy Law, 1831) was one of the first grammars of the Persian language. Originally written in Persian in 1831, it was translated into Russian in 1841 and became one of the bases for the development of iranistics in Russia.
- Ketab-e Asgariyyeh (The Book of Asgar, 1837) was Bakikhanov's first fiction book: a love story of two young people, persecuted by the fanatic society they lived in. The book was written in Azerbaijani language.
- Asrar al-Malakut (The Secrets of Heavens, 1839) is an introduction to astronomy, written in Arabic, later translated to Persian by Bakikhanov himself and translated to Ottoman Turkish by Seyyid Şeref Hayâtîzâde.
- Gulistan-i Iram (The Blooming Flower Garden, 1841) is one of his major works (written in Persian) and dedicated to the history of the East Caucasus from Ancient Times to 1813. It was nominated for a government award in 1845 by Alexander Neidgardt, viceroy of Caucasus, just before his death. An English translation of this work has been made by Willem Floor and Hasan Javadi and published by Mage Publishers in 2009.

=== Other works ===
- Tahzib al-Akhlaq (Education of Morals, 1832) was a book on morality for children, based on Oriental and Greek philosophy.
- Meraj-e Khayal (Ascension of the Dream) and Majlis-e Fireng (European Society) were written during his stay in Warsaw in 1833-1834, where he described his impressions of Poland.
- Ayn al-Mizan (Creature of Scales, 1835) was a book on formal logic in Arabic, donated by himself to Alexander Kazembek in 1840.
- Kitab-e Nasaikh (The Book of Admonitions, 1836) was a short collection of moralizing sayings, based on the previous book.
- Umumi Joghrafya (General Geography) was an unfinished book on geography, of which Asrar al-Malakut was supposed to be part of.

He also authored scientific essays, collected poems, articles, translations of various works into Azeri and Russian, etc.

== Philosophical and religious views ==
According to Ahmedov, Bakikhanov understood Allah as a kind of transcendental essence of the world, revealed in an infinite number of attributes. Sharing the messianic idea of Mahdism, Bakikhanov pointed out that Ali and his direct descendants personify the creed and power of the prophet. Direct communication from Ali is interrupted only on the twelfth imam; the last imam did not die, but was ascended to heaven by Allah.

Bakikhanov believed that Allah doesn't directly cause a person's happiness or unhappiness; instead, He provides opportunities for self-salvation or error. A person, through intelligence and knowledge, can strive for salvation, and Allah will assist and guide him. However, if a person neglects these gifts, Allah leaves him in error. Bakikhanov reconciled freedom of action with divine predestination mechanically: Allah creates actions in line with each individual's free choice. He also preached the concepts of hope (tawakkul) and contentment (rida), reflecting a Sufi influence in his views. Citing Rumi, Bakikhanov condemned the pursuit of external benefits, excessive fear of death, temptation (nafs) as desire for the forbidden and illicit, and the consumption of alcoholic beverages. Despite this, Bakikhanov was not an advocate of asceticism. He criticized both wickedness (fisq) and hermitage (zuhd), believing that both the hermit and the wicked deceive people with their sophisms and tricks.

According to him, the individual who wants to achieve individual perfection must be in a society, whether to get rid of disgraces or to protect virtues. In fact, according to him, religion comes after the public interest in ordering moral principles. For him, religion had a nature that confirms the principles that become evident by considering the public interest and the order of the world, rather than directly mentioning what is good.

== Family ==
In 1826 Bakikhanov married Sakina (b. 1807) his paternal cousin and grandnephew of Fatali Khan, daughter of Kalb Huseyn agha, with whom he had two daughters including Zibün Nisa Begüm (b. 1831) and Tughra Khanum (b. 1839) - both of whom married to their cousins Hasan agha and Ahmad agha.

== Awards ==
- Order of Saint Anna 3rd class - 1 January 1828 (for participation in Yerevan and Sardarabad battles of Russo-Persian War)
- Order of Saint Vladimir 4th class - 16 October 1828 (for the excellent courage and bravery shown in Russo-Turkish War and in the siege and capture of Kars)
- Order of Saint Anna 2nd class - 1829 (for taking part in the battles on June 19 and 20, 1829 in the Saganlug mountains)
- Order of Saint Anna 2nd class (version decorated with imperial crown) - 1829 (for participation in the battles on July 24, 1829 at Hart and September 27 at Bayburt)
- Order of Saint Stanislaus 3rd class - 1829
- Order of the Lion and the Sun 1st class (with diamonds on a diamond chain) - 1829, 1845

== Memory ==
- There is a municipality named after Bakikhanov in Baku.
- History institute of Azerbaijan National Academy of Sciences is named after Bakikhanov.
- There is a street named after him in Nasimi rayon of Baku.
- In October 2011, Abbasgulu Bakikhanov's statue was unveiled in Baku, in the municipality of Baku named after Bakikhanov. The park Bakikhanov, where the monument is, was overhauled, and then the monument was erected there.
- He was portrayed by Fakhraddin Manafov in 2012 film "Ambassador of Morning".
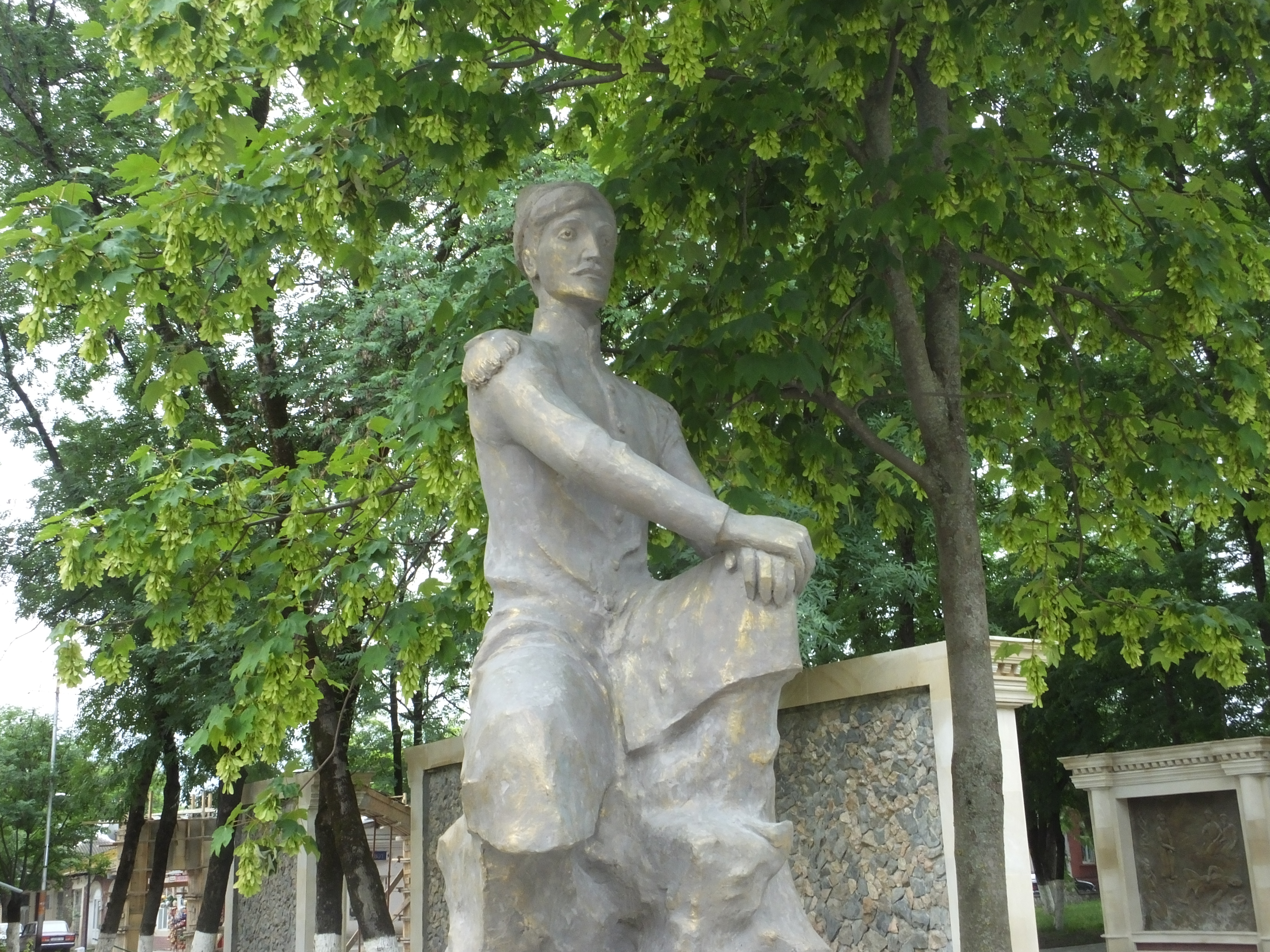
Bakikhanov's monument in Quba

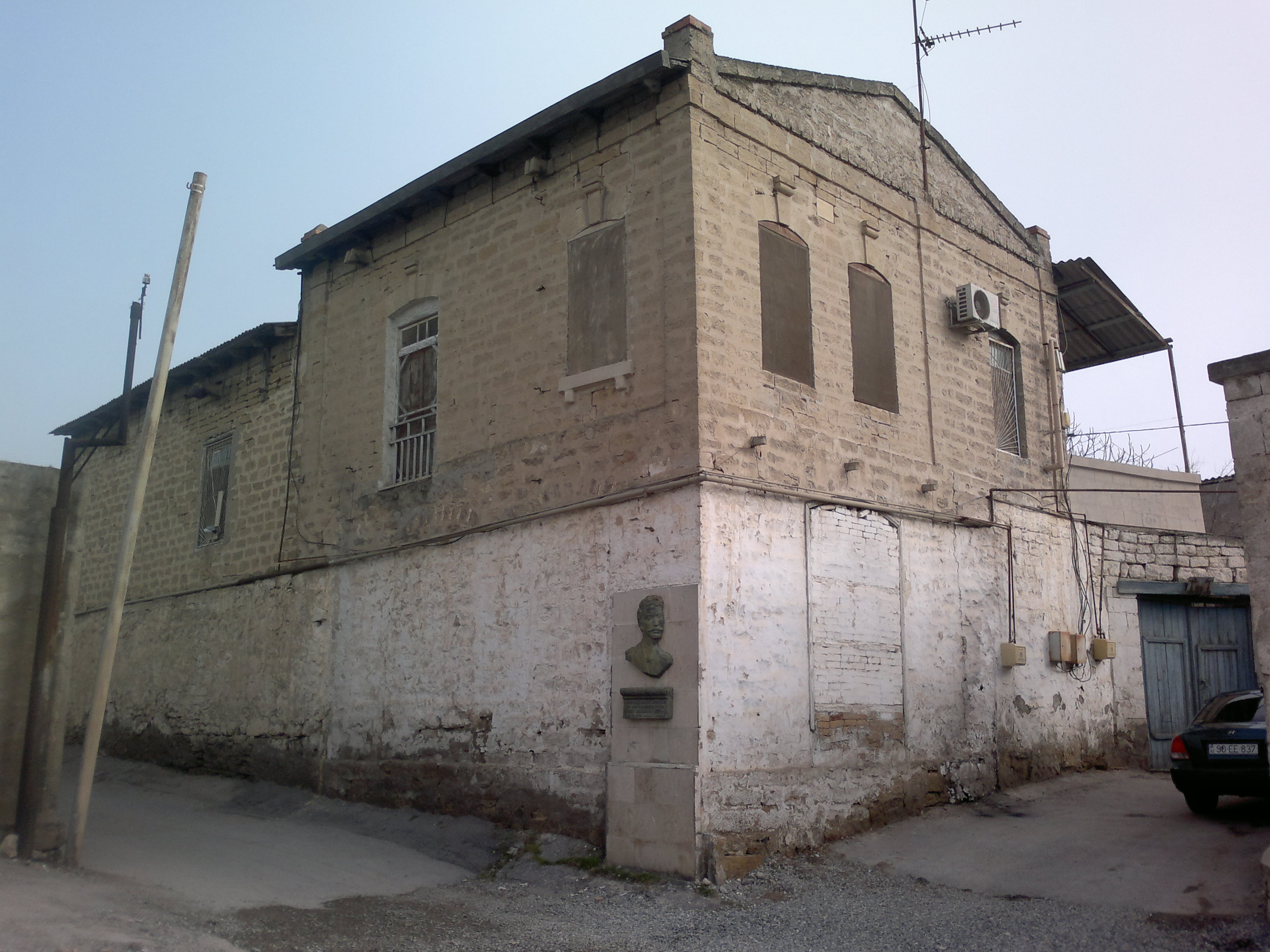
Bakikhanov's house in Əmircan with his memorial plaque

== Sources ==
- Ahmedov, E.M. (1983). Bunyadov, Z.M.; Jafarov, M.Z.; Ismayilov, M.I.; Kocharli, Firudin; Sunbatzade, A.S. (eds.). Аббас-Кули-ага Бакиханов - Сочинения, записки, письма [Abbasgulu agha Bakikhanov - Essays, notes, letters]. Классическое наследие Азербайджана [Classic Heritage of Azerbaijan] (in Russian). Baku: Elm.
- Bournoutian, George A. (2004). Two Chronicles on the History of Karabagh (Mirza Jamal Javanshir's "Tarikh-e Qarabaq" and Mirza Adigozal Beg's "Qarabaq Nameh."). Costa Mesa, California: Mazda Publishers. ISBN 1-56859-179-9.
- Floor, Willem M.; Javadi, Hasan (2009). The heavenly rose-garden: a history of Shirvan & Daghestan, by Abbas Qoli Aqa Bakikhanov. Mage Publishers. ISBN 978-1933823270.
- Gould, Rebecca Ruth. "The Persianate Cosmology of Historical Inquiry in the Caucasus: ʿAbbās Qulī Āghā Bākīkhānūf's Cosmological Cosmopolitanism," Comparative Literature 71.3 (2019): 272-297".
