= Talaat Khanlarov =

Soviet architect

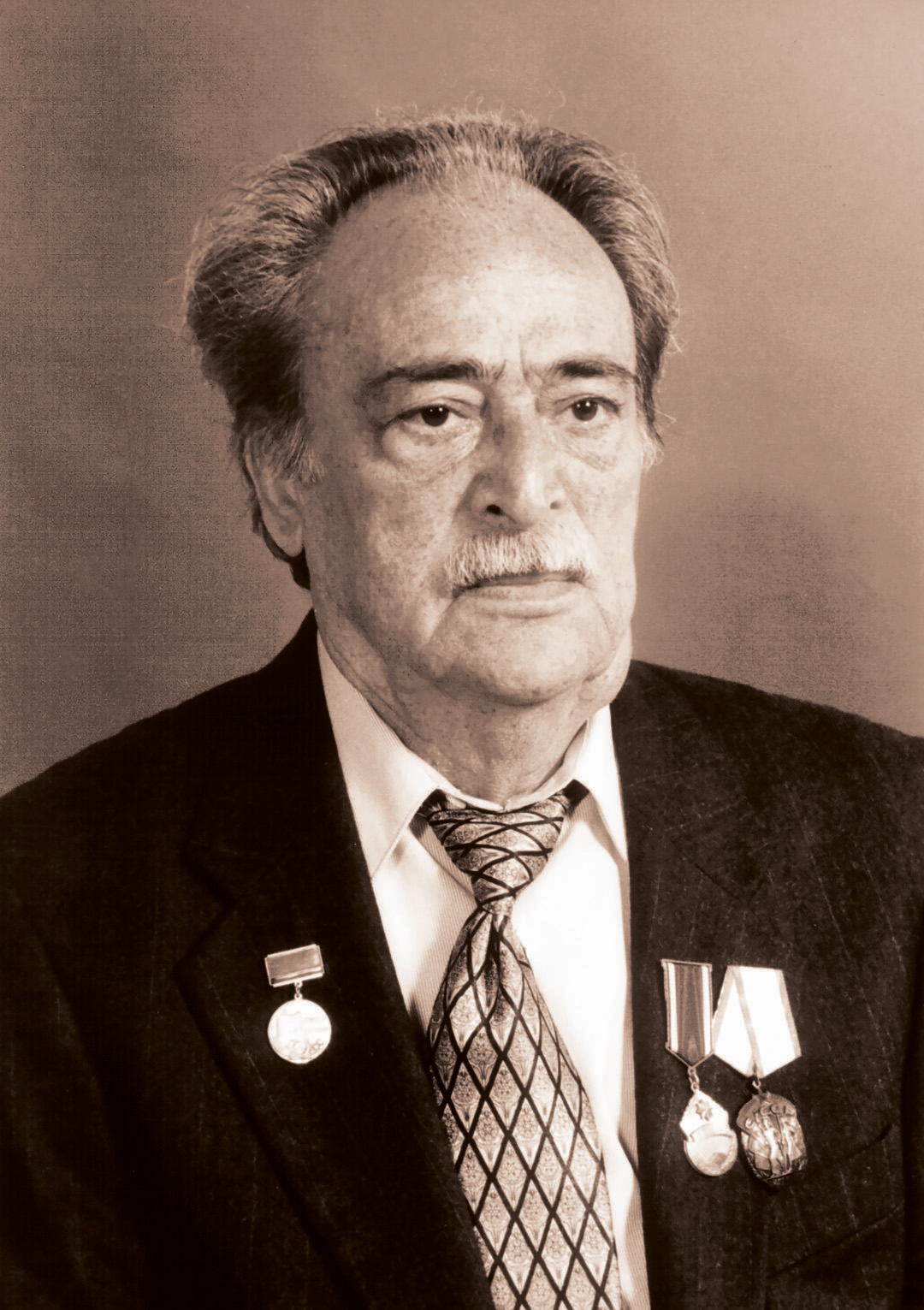
- Born: August 26, 1927; Baku, Azerbaijan SSR, Soviet Union
- Died: 2004 (aged 76–77); Baku, Azerbaijan
- Education: Azerbaijan Polytechnic Institute
- Occupation: Architect
- Practice: Azgosproekt (1956–1992); Baku City Executive Power
- Buildings: Heydar Aliyev Sports and Concert Complex; Memar Ajami metro station Central Statistics Office

Talaat Aghasibey oglu Khanlarov (Azerbaijani: Tələt Ağasıbəy oğlu Xanlarov; 1927–2004 was a Soviet-Azerbaijani architect, academician of the Academy of Sciences of Azerbaijan, Honored Architect of the Azerbaijan SSR (1975), and Vice President of the International Academy of Architecture of the East.

== Life ==
Talaat Khanlarov was born on August 26, 1927, in the family of Aghasibey Khanlarov, a graduate of the law faculty of St. Petersburg University, and Sara Khanim, one of the first graduates of the Azerbaijan Medical Institute. Talaat was the eldest son in the family.

At the age of 29, Talaat Khanlarov graduated from the architecture and construction faculty of the Azerbaijan Polytechnic Institute. From 1956 to 1992, he worked as an architect, chief architect of the project, head of the architectural-design department No. 2, and chief architect of the State Committee for Construction and Architecture "Azgosproekt". Khanlarov created his major works during his career there. From 1967 to 2002, he was a member of the Town Planning Council of the Main Architectural Department of the Baku City Executive Power.

== Works ==
Talaat Khanlarov is the author of more than 60 projects, including: Heydar Aliyev Sports and Concert Complex (with Yuzef Gadimov and Tahir Abdullayev), Memar Ajami metro station, Central Statistics Office, Computing Center of the Main Procurement Department, administrative buildings of executive authorities in Narimanov (with I. M. Ibrahimov) and Nizami (with H.K Mukhtarov) districts, Olympic rowing base in Mingachevir, "Kimyachi" Culture Palace named after Uzeyir Hajibeyov in Sumgayit, Tabriz hotel in Nakhchivan, and so on.

He is the author of memorial plaques and tombstones in the buildings where Gara Garayev, Huseyn Javid, Tofig Aliyev, Aliovsat Guliyev and other well-known Azerbaijanis have lived.

Heydar Aliyev Sports and Concert Complex

"Kimyachi" Culture Palace named after Uzeyir Hajibeyov

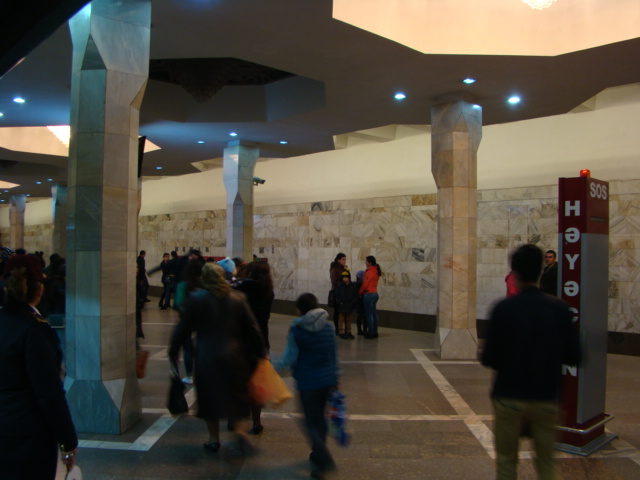
Interior of the Memar Ajami metro station

== Awards ==
- Azerbaijan SSR State Prize (1967).
- Jubilee Medal "In Commemoration of the 100th Anniversary of the Birth of Vladimir Ilyich Lenin" (1970).
- Honored Architect of the Azerbaijan SSR(1975).
- Order of the Badge of Honour (1980; No.1138768)
- Shohrat Order (2000; No.119)

== Scientific works ==
- Aghasibey oglu Khanlarov, Taalat (1972). Sovet Azərbaycanın memarlığı [Architecture of the Soviet Azerbaijan] (in Azerbaijani). Moscow: Stroyizdat.
