= The Petroglyph Museum =

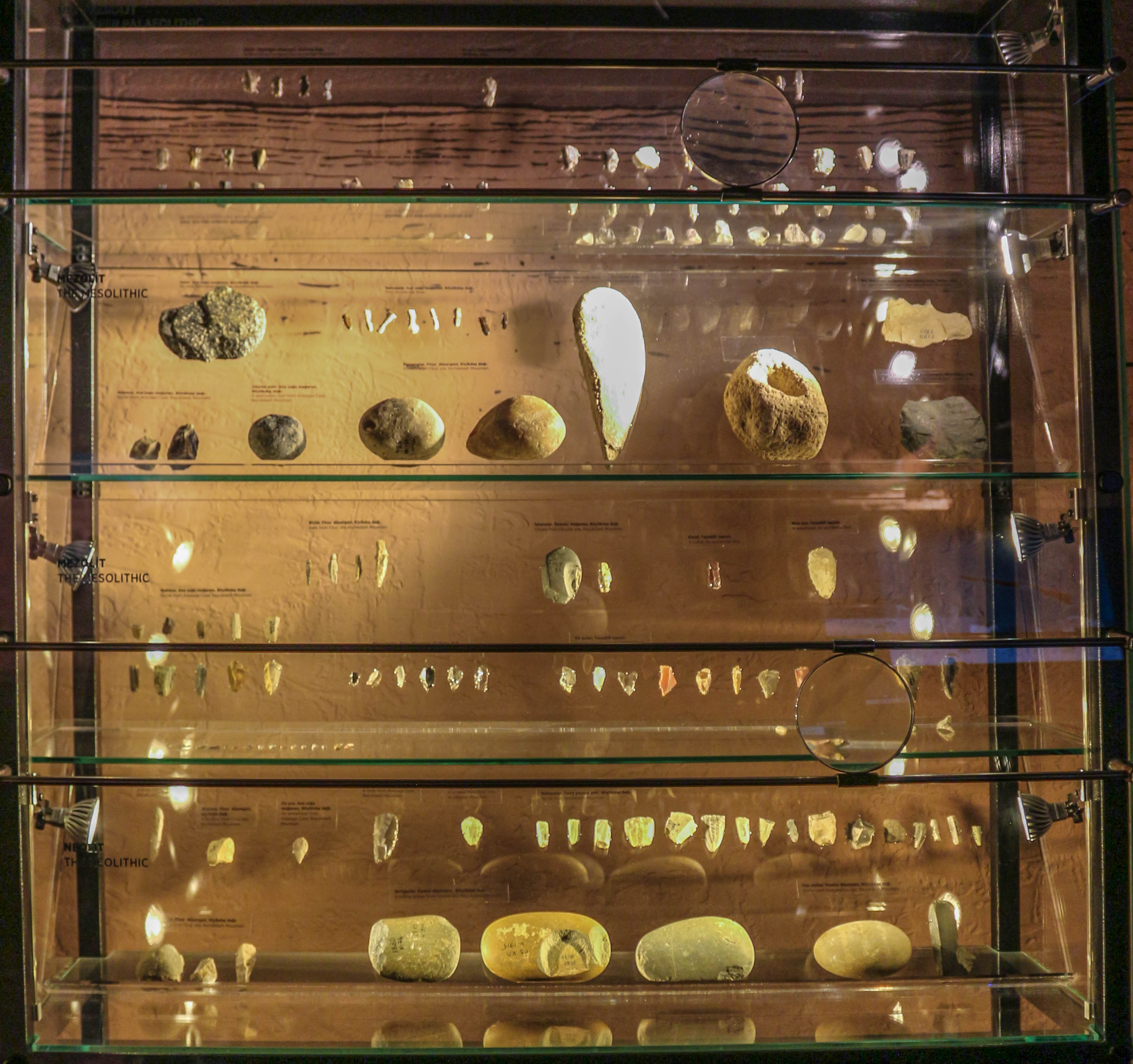
- Established: 26 December 2011
- Location: Gobustan State Historical and Cultural Reserve, Azerbaijan
- Coordinates: 40°25′N 50°00′E

The Petroglyph Museum is located within the Gobustan State Historical and Cultural Reserve in Azerbaijan and has been open since 2011.

== Design and construction ==
The construction of the museum was commissioned by the Azerbaijani Ministry of Culture in 2010, and it was officially opened on 26 December 2011 by President Ilham Aliyev.

== Building ==
The museum's exhibition hall is divided into several sections. One of these, "Gobustan: UNESCO World Cultural Heritage", presents information about 200 similar monuments worldwide. The museum also includes a 45-seat 3D cinema hall, equipped with seven sound amplifiers, monitors, and projectors.

== Collections ==
The museum’s permanent exhibition includes 12 rooms presenting the history, archaeology, and cultural significance of the Gobustan petroglyphs. Exhibits reflect the natural environment of Gobustan, archaeological discoveries, life and art in ancient periods, and interpretations of petroglyphs. The museum has interactive displays, multilingual touchscreens, facilities for research, conferences, and educational programs, and offers a 3D virtual flight over the reserve. It also houses a collection of over 100,000 archaeological objects.

== Awards ==
The museum received a Special Award at the European Museum of the Year Award in 2013.

== See also ==
- Yanar Dag
- Fire Temple of Baku
- Maiden Tower
