= Aliovsat Guliyev =

Azerbaijani historian (1922–1969)

Aliovsat Najafgulu oglu Guliyev
- Born: August 23, 1922; Kyzylagach, Salyan
- Died: November 6, 1969 (aged 47); Baku, Azerbaijan
- Burial place: Alley of Honor
- Occupation: historian

Aliovsat Najafgulu oglu Guliyev (Azerbaijani: Əliövsət Nəcəfqulu oğlu Quliyev; 23 August 1922 – 6 November 1969) was an Azerbaijani historian. Amongst his many accreditations, he was a holder of a PhD in history, a corresponding member of the National Academy of Sciences, head of the Institute of History of the National Academy of Sciences of Azerbaijan SSR (1952 – 1958 and 1967 – 1969) and an honored member of the Czechoslovakia-USSR Friendship Society.

== Education ==
Aliovsat Najafgulu oglu Guliyev was born in the village of Kyzylagach, located in the region of Salyan District, Azerbaijan. In 1930, he attended the village school in Kyzylagach. After early educational success he was transferred from first grade to the third grade and completed his education in five years instead of six. In 1935, he continued his education in the pedagogical college in the town of Salyan, whilst simultaneously teaching history in Middle School No. 4. After graduating in the same year from the pedagogical college, he was accepted into the faculty of history at the Azerbaijan State University. There he worked as a history teacher and gave classes to middle school students at school No. 172, in Baku.

In 1943, he was chosen as chairman of the trade union committee of the Azerbaijan State University. In 1944, he graduated from the university with honors. On the recommendation of the Department of History, he stayed on in a teaching role there. Guliyev applied for postgraduate study and was accepted. In 1945, he was chosen as the chairman of the trade union for workers in higher education and science and continued to work there until 1950. He was the first chairman of the toponymical commission at the Presidium of the Supreme Sovietof the Azerbaijan Soviet Socialist Republic.

== Academic career ==
In 1948, Guliyev defended his dissertation on the subject July General Strike in Baku in 1903 and became the dean of the Faculty of History at the Azerbaijan State University. In 1949, his first book in Azerbaijani under the title July General Strike in Baku in 1903 was published. His first book in Russian Brave Fighter For Communism, Lado Ketskhoveli (Russian:Мужественный борец за коммунизм Ладо Кецховели) was published in 1953.

As well as working at the National Academy of Sciences for many years, Guliyev also headed the Institute of History of the National Academy of Sciences twice: from 1952 to 1958 and from 1967 to 1969.

While he was head of the Academy of Sciences, and in all his subsequent roles, one of his great passions was to arrange to send young Azerbaijani scientists abroad to study and obtain internships at the academic institutes of Moscow and Leningrad. He managed to bring the academic institutes of Baku and Moscow together by creating strong relationships between them. In 1961, he successfully defended his doctoral dissertation on the subject Azerbaijan in the Second Half of the 19th Century and at the Beginning of the 20th Century and in 1962, he obtained his PhD in history. In 1968, he was chosen as a corresponding member of the National Academy of Sciences.

He was the author of more than 80 academic publications. They included: monographs, biographies of some of the notable revolutionaries, other historical books and articles on the Baku proletariat, the revolutionary movements in Azerbaijan and the history of ancient and middle century Azerbaijan. His books, monographs, school books, brochures and academic articles also illuminated other problems concerning this period. They included: Labor Movements in Azerbaijan in the Period of Revolutionary Upsurge (1910-1914) and Monopoly Capital in the Oil Industry of Pre-revolutionary Russia (1883–1914), as well as History of the USSR and People (Nations) of the Caucasus from the series of People (Nations) of the world.

A number of his articles on the history of Azerbaijanis were included in encyclopedias published in India, Czechoslovakia and many other countries. He was an Honored Member of Czechoslovak-Soviet Friendship Society. He was the first Azerbaijani historian to have an article published in Moscow Two-Volume Compendium of Ethnology.

== History of Azerbaijan ==
The History of Azerbaijan is widely considered to be his masterpiece. He worked on iy as both an author and an editor. In 1948, he received an assignment from the government and began working on the History of Azerbaijan. An editorial board was set up and the main theme was chosen. The board consisted of the Professor I.A. Huseynov of the National Academy of Sciences of Azerbaijan, A.Sumbatzade and M.A. Dadashzade who were members of the National Academy of Sciences, Z.I. Ibrahimov, a corresponding member of Azerbaijan National Academy of Sciences, a candidate of historical sciences Е.А. Tokarjevskiy and Guliyev himself. The secretary of the editorial board was the candidate of historical sciences I.V. Striqunov.

In 1958, the first volume of the trilogy History of Azerbaijan – From Ancient Times to the Annexation of Azerbaijan to Russia was published. In 1960, the second volume From Annexation of Azerbaijan to Russia to the February Bourgeois Revolution in 1917 was published. 1963 saw the publication of the third volume consisting of two books, Azerbaijan in the Period of Proletarian Revolution and Building Socialism and Azerbaijan in the Years of Completion of the Building of a Socialist Society and in the Period of Full-scale Construction of Communism..

== Death ==
In 1968, Guliyev visited India as a part of an official scientific delegation. On November 6, 1969, he died from acute leukemia at the age of 47. It is believed that injections administered prior to his visit to India contributed to his death. His funeral took place on November 10, 1969. He was buried at the Alley of Honor in Baku.

In his honor, the Salyan Culture House, a school in his hometown and a central street in Baku were named after him; a commemorative plaque has been installed at the building where he used to live.

== Personal life ==
Guliyev was married to Khanum Rahimova for 27 years. They had four children: one son and three daughters.

== Honors and awards ==
- Order of the Red Banner of Labor
- Medal "For Valiant Labor in the Great Patriotic War 1941–1945"
- Certificate of Honor of the Supreme Soviet of Azerbaijan SSR (twice)
- Second class medal of Czechoslovakia-USSR Friendship Society “The order of the Badge of Honor”

== Selected publications ==
- 50 Years of the Trade Union of Oil Industry Workers (co-authored with M.I.Naydel) (in Russian), Baku, 1956
- Alyosha Dzhaparidze (Historical-Biographical Essay (oçerk)). Baku, 1957
- "A Brief Historical Sketch of Azerbaijan" (a section in the book Azerbaijan SSR). Moscow (in Russian), 1957
- "A brief Historical Sketch of Azerbaijan" (co-authored with E.A Tojarevsk and M.A Kaziyev. Section in the book of Socialist Azerbaijan. Moscow (in Russian), 1958
- Azerbaijan SSR. Ukrainian Soviet Encyclopedia. Volume 1. Kiev (in Ukrainian), 1960
- 40 Years of the Azerbaijan SSR (1920–1960) (collective). Tbilisi (in Georgian), 1960
- The Development of Historical Science in Azerbaijan in the 19th Century and in the Beginning of 20th Century (co-authored with I.M Hasanov and I.V Struginov). Baku, 1960.
- Historiography of Azerbaijan (Second Half of the 12th century). Co-authored with I.M Hasanov. Moscow (in Russian), 1960
- Azerbaijan SSR. Historical Sketch. Soviet Historical Encyclopedia. Volume 1. Moscow (in Russian), 1961
- The Baku Proletariat in the Years of New Revolutionary Upsurge. (Monograph). Baku (in Russian), 1963
- "Azerbaijan". Historical essay. In the book: Atlas of the Azerbaijan SSR. Baku-Moscow, 1963
- Hummet (co-authored with J.B.Guliyev). Soviet Historical Encyclopedia, Volume 4. Moscow (in Russian), 1963
- "The Beginning of the Labor Movement in Azerbaijan: The Emergence of the First Social-democratic Circles. Foundation of the Baku Organization RSDRP (1880s–1901)". Co-authored with I.V. Strigunov. Chapter 1. (In the book: Essay on the History of the First Communist Party of Azerbaijan. Baku (in Russian), 1963
- I.P.Vachek During the Revolutionary Movement in Baku. Monograph. Baku (in Russian), 1965

== Schoolbooks (textbooks) ==
- Ana dili (The Mother Tongue). Baku, 1951-1960s (in Azerbaijani language). Azerneshr.
- Ana dili (The Mother Tongue). Baku, 1961–1967. Ushaqgencneshr.
- History of Azerbaijan. (Book for grades 7–8) (relevant chapters). Baku, 1964
