= Karim Shukurov =

Azerbaijani historian and professor

- Born: 1956.05.10; Azerbaijan Republic, Barda region
- Occupations: Director of Azerbaijan National Academy of Sciences, İnstitute of History and Ethnology n.a.A.A.Bakikhanov
- Known for: Doctor of Historical Sciences, Professor
- Awards: State Prize of the Republic of Azerbaijan Jubilee Medal "100th Anniversary of Heydar Aliyev (1923–2023)"; Shohrat Order Badge named after "Academician Jahangir Karimov" established by the Russian Institute of Philosophy and Law; Order of "Glory"

Shukurov Karim Karam oglu (Şükürov Kərim Kərəm oğlu; born May 10, 1956) is an Azerbaijani historian, doctor of Historical Science, professor, laureate of the State Prize of the Republic of Azerbaijan, general director of the History and Ethnology Institute named after A. A. Bakikhanov of ANAS, chairman of the Scientific Council of the institute, and professor of the Azerbaijan University of Tourism and Management.

He studied the legal and political issues of population migration between Iran and the Russian Empire, the dynamics and location of migrants, the sources and historiography of population studies, and the historical demography of Azerbaijan.

== Biography ==
Shukurov was born on May 10, 1956, in Barda, Azerbaijan, as the third child of a family of six children. His father was engaged in trade, and he was interested in reading.

In 1962, he went to the first grade of secondary school in Barda city, and he graduated from it in 1972. He then entered the Faculty of History at Azerbaijan State University and graduated with honors in 1977. After graduating from the university, he went to work as a teacher, deputy director of the secondary school, and second secretary of the Barda Komsomol committee from 1977 to 1980. He was elected deputy of the Barda city council. In September 1980, he entered the postgraduate course at Baku State University and started teaching at the university. In 1983, after completing postgraduate studies, he was appointed a teacher at the university. He was one of the organizers and heads of the Scientific-Research Laboratory of Historical Demography of Azerbaijan. Since the beginning of 2021, he has been the general director of the Institute of History and Ethnology. He is also a professor at the Azerbaijan Tourism and Management University. He is the consulting editor of Visions of Azerbaijan magazine.

In 1984, he defended his candidature as a Doctor of Philosophy, and in 2007, he defended his doctoral theses in Azerbaijan in the Dissertation Council operating under the Institute of History of ANAS. He is the author of more than a hundred articles and books. His books and articles have been published in Azerbaijani, Russian, English, German, Arabic and Persian.

He is a member of the Expert Council on History and Political Sciences of the Higher Attestation Commission under the President of the Republic of Azerbaijan and the Chairman of the Scientific Council of the Institute of History and Ethnology of ANAS. He does extensive work in the field of historical science promotion. He is the host of the weekly History of Azerbaijan program on AzTV. He is a member of the "History, Archeology, and Anthropology" editorial board of the research journal "METAFISIKA" from the 14th issue.

== Main scientific works ==
- Azerbaijan in European Painting: A Historical Overview, Baku, 2024, 550 p (book)
- A HISTORY OF AZERBAIJAN: FROM THE FURTHEST PAST TO THE PRESENT DAY. Journal of VISIONS OF AZERBAIJAN, March-April 2011 (article)
- AZERBAIJANI JEWS: A Historical Ethnic Phenomenon. Journal of VISIONS OF AZERBAIJAN, May-June 2011 (article)
- CAUSE AND EFFECT. Journal of VISIONS OF AZERBAIJAN, July-August 2011 (article)
- Visits of President İlham Aliyev to the territories liberated from occupation: from historical victory the reconstruction and the Great Return. from the book of called "The history of the Patriotic War. Personality Factor" Baku, Sharg-Garb, 2023
- Turkmenchay - 1828: The Historical chronicle (with redaction). Baku, 2006, 188 p.
- ALBANIA (CAUCASUS): HISTORICAL-DEMOGRAPHIC PLOTS. Conference "Caucasian Albania: religious and social life", 14th April, 2023, p.15-16
- THE DEMOGRAPHY OF INDEPENDENCE (1991-2011).Journal of VISIONS OF AZERBAIJAN, September-October 2011
- AZERBAIJANI HISTORY: FROM THE FURTHEST PAST TO THE PRESENT DAY. Visions of Azerbaijan Magazine. March-April, 2010
- Azerbaijani civilization history and origins. Article from the materials of the scientific conference "Studia Wschodnioeuropejskie (Azerbaijan, its impact on Europe’s energy security and relations with Poland - yesterday and today)" - Warszawa 2023. p.7-15

== Awards ==
1. The winner of the State Award of the Republic of Azerbaijan
2. He was awarded the jubilee medal for the "100th anniversary of Heydar Aliyev (1923–2023)" by Decree No. 4289 of Ilham Aliyev, February 2, 2024.
3. Badge named after "Academician Jahangir Karimov" established by the Russian Institute of Philosophy and Law
4. On November 5, 2025, he was awarded the Order of "Glory" by the decree of the President of the Republic of Azerbaijan "For his services to the development of Azerbaijani science"

== Filmography ==
1. Armenian genocide and Turk's word (2001; Erməni soyqırımı and Türkün sözü)
2. Azerbaijani khanates, Nakhchivan and Iravan khanates. Movie 5 (2003; Azərbaycan xanlıqları, Naxçıvan və İrəvan xanlıqları and 5-ci film)
3. Map of Azerbaijan (2006; Azərbaycan xəritəsi)
4. Azerbaijani carpets and Karabakh group (2013; Azərbaycan xalçaları and Qarabağ qrupu)

== Virtual exhibition ==
On May 10, 2021, a virtual exhibition was opened by the employees of the National Library of Azerbaijan named after M. F. Akhundzade on the occasion of the 65th anniversary of the Azerbaijani historian, Professor Karim Shukurov. Information about Shukurov is on display in the virtual exhibition.
