= Book about Asker =

- by Abbasgulu Bakikhanov
- Original title: Kitabi-Əsgəriyyə
- Written: 1837
- First published in: 1861
- Language: Azerbaijani
- Genre(s): novel

The Book about Asker (Azerbaijani: کتاب عسکریّه, Kitabi-Əsgəriyyə) is the story of the Azerbaijani scientist and illuminator Abbasgulu Bakikhanov, written in 1837. This is Bakikhanov's second prose work. The story tells about the mutual love of a boy and a girl persecuted by a fanatical environment. In the story the "Book about Asker", Bakikhanov spoke about the freedom of love and opposed prejudices.

The "Book about Asker" was published in 1861 in St. Petersburg, in the "Textbook of the Tatar-Azerbaijani language" compiled by Mirza Abulhasan bey Vazirov. In this edition, the author published the "Book about Asker", simplifying and sometimes making abbreviations. The critical text of the manuscript, found in the city of Guba in the Ardebil mosque and sent to the manuscript fund of the Institute of Language and Literature named after Nizami, in Baku, was published in 1946 in the first volume of the institute's publications.
