= Kürdçü =

- Location within Azerbaijan
- Coordinates: 39°57′49″N 49°15′39″E
- Country: Azerbaijan
- Rayon: Hajigabul
- Municipality: Atbulaq
- Time zone: UTC+4 (AZT)
  - Summer (DST): UTC+5 (AZT)

Kürdçü (also, Kurtchu, Kyurkchili, and Mirizali) is a village in the Hajigabul Rayon of Azerbaijan. The village forms part of the municipality of Atbulaq.
