= Qızılağac, Salyan =

Qızılağac
- Municipality
- Location within Azerbaijan
- Coordinates: 39°30′36″N 48°55′07″E
- Country: Azerbaijan
- Rayon: Salyan

Population
  - Total: 1,615
- Time zone: UTC+4 (AZT)
  - Summer (DST): UTC+5 (AZT)

Qızılağac (also, Kizyl-Agach, Kizyl-Aghach, and Kyzylagach) is a village and municipality in the Salyan Rayon of Azerbaijan. It has a population of 1,615.
