= Amsar, Quba =

Amsar
- Municipality
- Location within Azerbaijan
- Coordinates: 41°19′58″N 48°32′11″E
- Country: Azerbaijan
- Rayon: Quba

Population
  - Total: 2,475
- Time zone: UTC+4 (AZT)
  - Summer (DST): UTC+5 (AZT)

Amsar is a village and municipality in the Quba Rayon of Azerbaijan. It has a population of 2,475.
