= Ishag Jafarzadeh =

Azerbaijani archaeologist (1895–1982)

Ishag Mammadrza oglu Jafarzadeh (Azerbaijani: İshaq Məmmədrza oğlu Cəfərzadə; August 14, 1895 in Ganja – January 5, 1982, in Baku) was one of the pioneers of Azerbaijan archaeology and ethnography. He excavated over seventy artifacts on Azerbaijan's territory and studied the Gobustan rock paintings. In 1948, during the Gobustan expedition, he discovered the Latin rock inscription near mountain Boyukdash, 70 km from Baku, which is the easternmost Roman evidence to be known.

== Works ==
- "Azərbaycanın qədim tarixi" ("Ancient History of Azerbaijan"), Azərb. SSR EA Tarix və Fəlsəfə İnstitutunun əsərləri, c. 1, B., 1961
- Историко-археологический очерк очерк старой Ганджи (Родина Низами) (Historico-Archaeological Sketch on Old Ganja), Б., 1949
- Гобустан. Наскальные изображения (Gobustan. The Rock Paintings), Б., 1973
