= Atbulaq =

- Municipality
- Location within Azerbaijan
- Coordinates: 39°58′29″N 49°16′01″E
- Country: Azerbaijan
- Rayon: Hajigabul

Population
  - Total: 3,175
- Time zone: UTC+4 (AZT)
  - Summer (DST): UTC+5 (AZT)

Atbulaq (also, Atbulak) is a village and municipality in the Hajigabul Rayon of Azerbaijan. It has a population of 3,175. The municipality consists of the villages of Atbulaq and Kürdçü.
