= Alisohbat Sumbatzade =

Azerbaijani oriental historian (1907-1992)

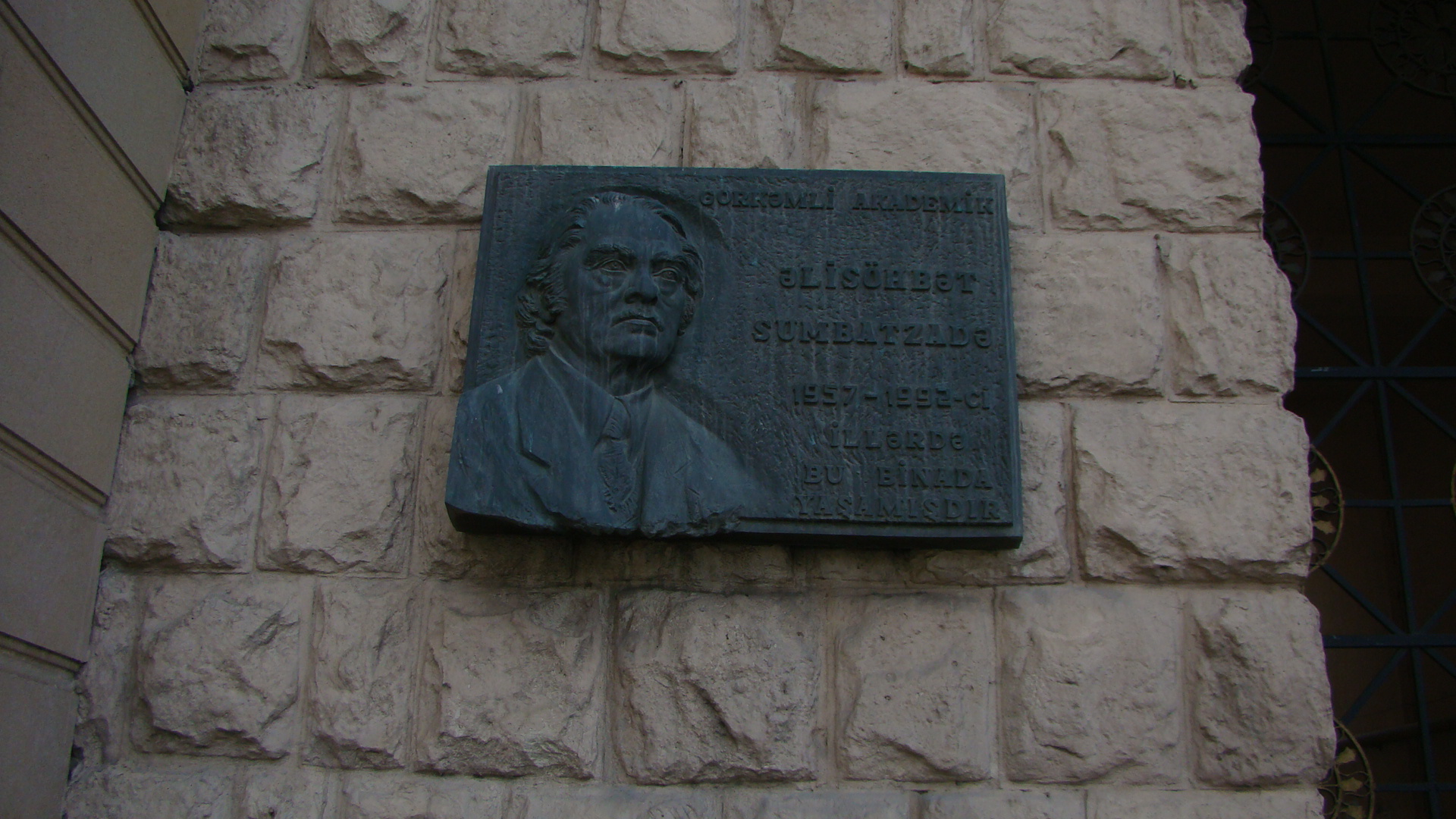
Commemorative plaque

Alisohbat Sumbat oglu Sumbatzade (8 January 1907, Amirjan, Baku – 28 January 1992, Baku) was a Soviet Azerbaijani historian and orientalist (member of the Academy of Sciences of the Azerbaijani SSR from 1958).

Sumbatzade graduated from the Department of Oriental Studies of Azerbaijan State University in 1929. In 1963 he became director of the Institute of the Peoples of the Near and Middle East of the Academy of Sciences of the Azerbaijan SSR. Sumbatzade's main works tackle the socioeconomic history of Azerbaijan in the 19th and 20th centuries.

His works were cited by The Cambridge History of Iran.
