= Muhammad Husayn Khan Mushtaq =

Khan of Shaki from 1759 to 1780

Muhammad Husayn

Khan of Shaki
- Reign: 1759 – 1780
- Predecessor: Aghakishi beg
- Successor: Haji Khan
- Died: August, 1780
- Burial: Shaki Khans' Mosque
- House: House of Black Monk
- Father: Hasan Agha

Muhammad Husayn Khan Mushtaq (Persian: محمد حسین خان مشتاق), was the third khan of Shaki. He was described as a courageous but ruthless man by Abbasgulu agha Bakikhanov.

== Early years ==
He was a grandson of Haji Chalabi. His father Hasan agha died in a battle against the Afsharid army. After the murder of his uncle Aghakishi beg, he fled to Shirvan and appealed for help from Aghasi Khan, who in turn defeated the Gazikumukh armies and retook Shaki.

== Reign ==
Despite his succession, naib of Arash, Malik Ali, who was now styled "Sultan of Arash" did not acknowledge his suzerainty. Only in 1761 he was put under vassalage of the khanate thanks to the interference of Fatali khan Afshar who was at time campaigning in Karabakh. Malik Ali was killed shortly thereafter by the khan.

He became allied to Fatali khan of Quba by 1760s in order to invade the Shirvan Khanate. In order to start the negotiation, Muhammad Said khan of Shirvan himself went to Fatali Khan's court and his brother Aghasi khan headed to Muhammad Husayn's. However, Aghasi khan was blinded by Muhammad Husayn, while his brother was imprisoned. The khanate was invaded by 700 Shaki soldiers, whereas the Quba army was as strong as 7000. The khanate was divided between Shaki and Quba Khanates who appointed their own governors. The western part was governed by Manaf Zarnavai.

Soon in August 1768, an uncovered plot worsened the relation between allies. Manaf Zarnavai, who was instructed by Muhammad Husayn khan, was aiming to overthrow the Quba rule and incorporate Shirvan to Shaki as a whole. However their conspiracy was discovered by Fatali khan who invaded Agsu on 17 August 1768 and killed Manaf. The Shaki armies were crushed by the Quba and Gazikumukh alliance on 20 September 1768, Shirvan was fully annexed to the Quba Khanate. The peace agreement was signed in July 1769.

== Death ==
While he managed to keep his throne, he was not unrivalled, his uncle Jafar agha was a popular rival, who claimed the throne by virtue of being a son of Haji Chalabi. Husayn khan chose to murder him in 1770, which caused his other uncle Haji Abdulqadir to rebel and flee to the mountains. Abdulqadir was allied with the Arash Sultanate beys, Haji Chalabi's cousin Haji Rasul and other nobility members who were feeling begrudged because of the recent execution. Muhammad Husayn sent his son Muhammad Hasan to negotiate, however he was imprisoned and sent to Karabakh. Khan was later ambushed by his uncle Haji Abdulqadir in 1780, who along with his 70 men invaded the khan's house and captured him while killing his son Ahmad. He was forced to resign between 22 and 29 August and subsequently killed.

== Family ==
He had four sons: Muhammad Hasan khan, Fatali khan, Salim khan, Ahmad and a daughter Tubu khanum, who married to Ibrahim Khalil khan.

== Legacy ==
His reign is mostly known for cultural activities as he was interested in arts. The Palace of Shaki Khans was one of his main ambitious projects alongside the Shakikhanov's Palace and the Shaki Khan's Mosque. Along with these, he also wrote poetry under the pen name Müştaq (Enamored).

== Gallery ==
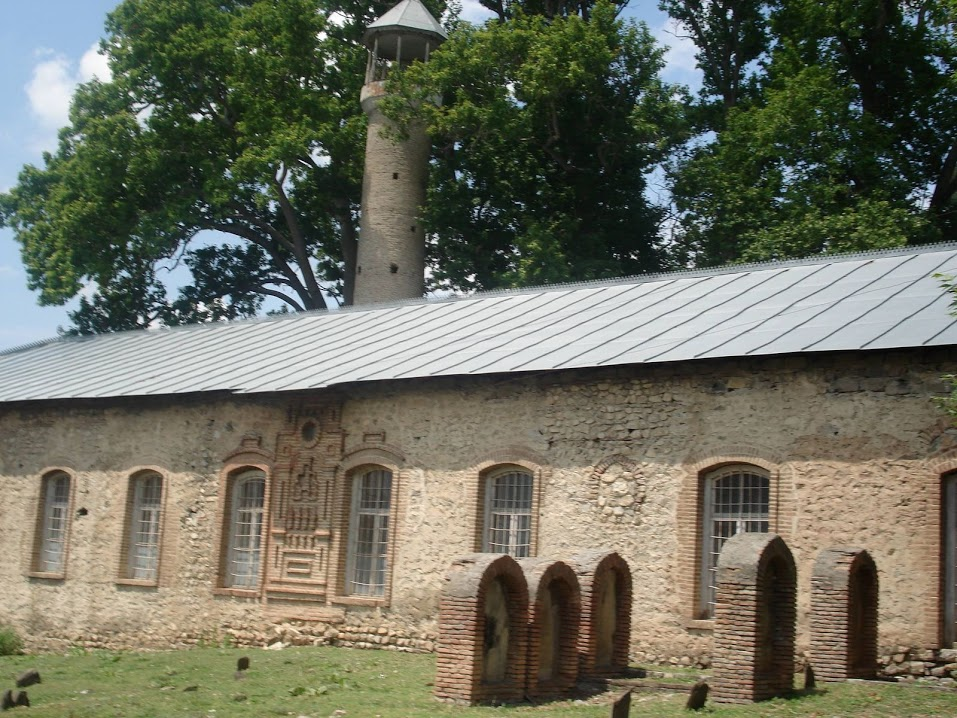
Shaki Khan's Mosque

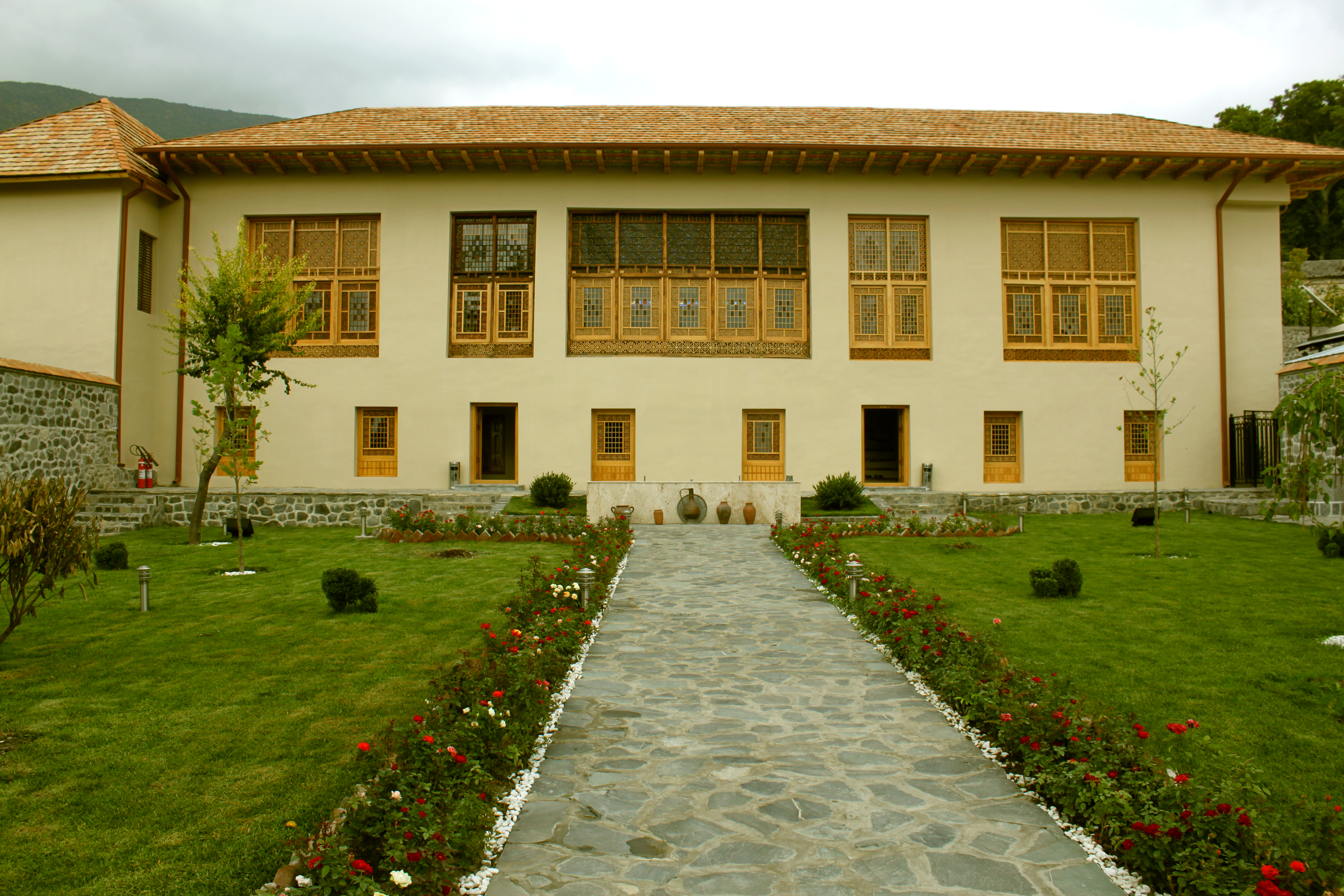
House of Shakikhanovs

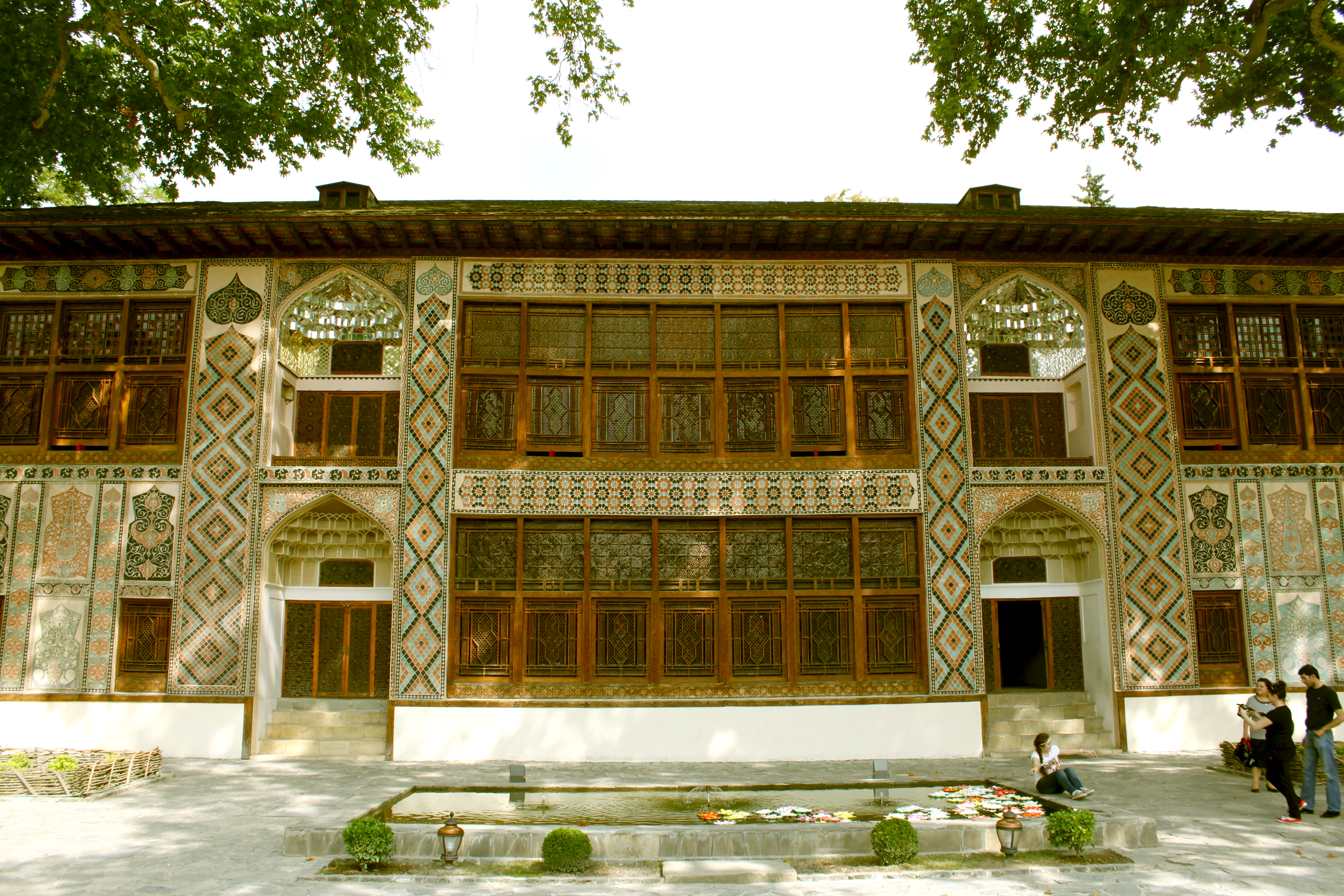
Palace of the Shaki khans'
