= Arash Sultanate =

Eurasian polity

Sultanate of Arash ارش سلطان‌لیغی
- 1747–1795
- Status: Sultanate; Under Shaki Khanate suzerainty
- Capital: Arash
- Common languages: Persian (official), Azerbaijani
- Sultan
- History
  - Establishment: 1747
  - Abolished within Shaki Khanate: 1795
Preceded by	Succeeded by
Safavid Empire	Russian Empire; Areshsky Uyezd

Arash Sultanate was a feudal fiefdom that existed between 1747-1795 in Transcaucasus. It comprised modern Aghdash, Yevlakh and Mingachevir raion of Azerbaijan.

== History ==
Arash as a city was founded in 15th century. It was governed within Shirvan beylarbeylik of Safavid Empire. Later, it was later put under suzerainty of Shaki Khanate by Haji Chalabi Khan. It consisted of 27 settlements with ~5000 population, 19% of them being Armenian or Udi.

== Sultans ==
- Malik Ali – was involved in Aghakishi beg's murder in 1759. Later, rebelled against Muhammad Husayn Khan Mushtaq who was his son-in-law in 1761, but put under his suzerainty with confirmation from Fatali khan Afshar. Killed shortly after that.
- Malik Ali Muhammad – son of former.
- Malik Ali Husayn
- Shabaddin Sultan – nephew of Malik Ali, rebelled against Muhammad Hasan khan, killed in 1795. After his death, sultanate was abolished and absorbed into Shaki Khanate as a district.
