= Epigraphic monuments in the cemetery of Shaki Khan =

Inscriptions in Azerbaijan

- Azerbaijani: Şəki Xan qəbiristanlığındakı epiqrafik abidələr
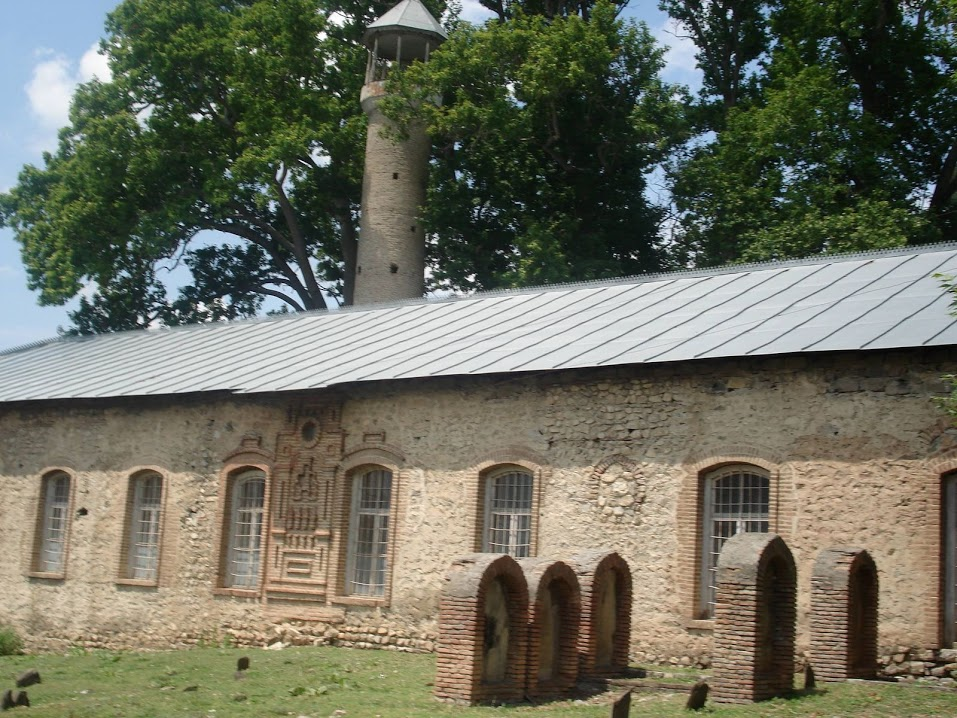
- Khan Mosque and Khan Cemetery in the city of Shaki
- Interactive map of Epigraphic monuments in the cemetery of Shaki Khan

Details
- Country: Azerbaijan
- Coordinates: 41.2022°N 47.1919°E
- Type: City

The epigraphic monuments in the cemetery of Shaki Khan consist of inscribed headstones, fragments of inscribed headstones, and one inscribed tombstone, which are currently there or were there at one time.

== General information ==
There were 15-20 written headstones in the Shaki Khan cemetery, located on the eastern side of the Shaki Khans' Mosque. Currently, there are only 10 inscribed headstones and one inscribed tombstone.

Mashadikhanim Nemat reported about the inscriptions of 9 headstones in the cemetery in his article published in a scientific publication in 1961, and about several headstones in his books published in 1984 and 2001. In 2009, Aydın Mammadov read the inscription on a part of a headstone and determined for the first time that the headstone belonged to Ismail Khan's daughter Saadat Bey. At the end of 2018, ANAS Sheki Regional Scientific Center started a complex study of epigraphic monuments in the cemetery.

There is a headstone on the grave of only one of the Shaki Khans, Fatali Khan, in the cemetery. Although it is known that his brother Muhammadhasan Khan, who died in Astrakhan in 1831, was buried in this cemetery, and his father Muhammadhusein Khan was buried in the mihrab of the Khan Mosque, his headstones have not been discovered.

There is no doubt that the grave of the young Javad Khan's wife is also here; the source shows that after Javad Khan was killed in a battle with the Russians, his wife returned to Nukha (she was the sister of Mohammadhasan Khan) and died there in 1830.

As a result of the scientific research conducted by the "Yukhari Bash" National Historical-Architecture Reserve conducted in 2022, it was found that some of the decorative-applied art examples of headstones collected by the Sheki Museum of History and Local History and kept in its fund and taken under state protection were found in the Sheki Khan cemetery over time. are existing grave monuments. As a result of the scientific research carried out by the reserve, it was found that one of these headstones belonged to the son of Muhammad Huseyn Khan, who died at a young age, named Khanlar. This fact is unknown to the experts of the previous period who studied the cemetery of Shaki Khan.

According to some authors, at the beginning of 2010, one intact headstone and several headstone parts were taken from the cemetery and taken to the museum. The whole headstone taken from the Khan's cemetery belonged to Seltanat Beym, the half-sister of Fatali Khan Khoyski, the prominent statesman of Azerbaijan, and one of the headstone fragments belonged to Saadat Beym, the mother of Seltanet Beym (daughter of Ismail Khan Khoyski).

== List ==
Şəki Xan qəbiristanlığının ümumi görünüşü
Image	Name, father's name and surname	Date of birth	Date of death	Note
Mustafa Agha's headstone
	Mustafa Agha Karim Agha Oghlu Shakikhanov	≈1831	November 5, 1895 (1313, 17th of Jamadiyal-Awwal month)	
Goycek Khanum's headstone
	Goycek Khanum Daughter of Mahammadhuseyn Khan		June-May, 1849 (Rajab month of 1265)	
Gullu khanim's headstone
	Gullu khanim Daughter of Karim Agha Shakikhanova		19.11.1858 (12.04.1275 Hijri)	
Fatali Khan's headstone
	Fatali Khan Son of Mahammadhuseyn Khan		11.05.1815 (02.05.1230 Hijri)	
Karim Agha Shakikhanov's headstone
	Karim Agha Son of Fatali Khan Shakikhanov	≈1788	10.12.1858 (14.05.1275 Hijri)	
Jamila Khanum's headstone
	Jamila Khanum Daughter of Mahammadhuseyn Khan		26.07.1835 (02.01.1251 Hijri)	
Telli Bayim's headstone
	Telli Bayim Daughter of Abdulhamid Agha		1899/1900 (1317 Hijri)	
Abdulhamid Agha's headstone
	Abdulhamid Agha Son of Abdulhashim Agha		1854/55 (1271 Hijri)	
Tuti Agha's headstone
	Tuti Agha Daughter of Mahammadhasan Khan		23.11.1859 (23.04. 1276 Hijri)	
Haji Aga Nigar's/Zeynab's headstone
	Haji Aga Nigar's/Zeynab's headstone		1817/1818 (Hijri 1233)	Although Meshadikhanim Neymat in her book published in 2001 shows the name on the headstone as "Zeynab, the daughter of Haji Agha Bey" In her book, he presented this name as "Haji Aga Nigar Haji gizi".
Saltanat bayim's headstone
	Saltanat Bayim Daughter of Iskandar Khan		05.01.1869 (22.09.1285 Hijri)	At the beginning of 2010, this intact headstone was taken from the cemetery together with several parts of it and taken to the Shaki Museum of History and Geography named after R.b. Efendiyev and is kept there until now. Seltanat Beyim was the half-sister of Fatali Khan Khoyski, a prominent statesman of Azerbaijan.
Saadat Khanum's headstone
	Saadat Khanum Daughter of Ismayil Khan	1819	24.07.1892 (Hijri 28.12.1309 year)	At the beginning of 2010, it was taken from the cemetery and taken to the Shaki Museum of History and Geography named after R.b. Efendiyev, and it is kept there until now. Saadat Khanum's mother was Tuti Agha.
Fountain inscription
	Mahammad Pasha Ahmad Khan Oghlu	May 20 1859 (17 Shawwal Hijri 1275)	October 5, 1920 (Hijri 21 Muharram 1339 year)	An inscription engraved on a spring stone

== See also ==
- Ancient Muslim cemetery (Baku)

== Source ==
- Nuxa "Xan qəbiristanlığı"ndakı başdaşıların kitabələri haqqında.
- Tahirzadə Ə.Ş. Şəkinin tarixi qaynaqlarda.
- Нейматова М.С. Мемориальные памятники Азербайджана: XII-XIX века (PDF).
- Неймат М.С. Корпус эпиграфических памятников Азербайджана. Vol. II : Арабо-персо-тюркоязычные надписи Шеки-Закатальской зоны : ХIV век (1000 экз ed.).
- AKAK+ // Акты, собранные Кавказской археографической комиссией. VI, часть вторая. Тифлис. под редакцией: А. П. Берже. 1875. 905.
- "F. x. Xoyskinin bacısının baş daşı Şəki Xan qəbristanlığından "yığışdırılmış"dır!". 2010.
- "Ədalət Tahirzadənin "Şəkinin tarixi qaynaqlarda" kitabı". 2006.
- "Şəki Xan qəbiristanlığı". 2009.
- Məhəmmədhüseyn xan Müştaq.
