= Fath-Ali Khan of Shaki =

Khan of Shaki (d. 1815)

Fatali Khan

Khan of Shaki
- Reign: 28 January 1805 – 25 February 1805
- Predecessor: Muhammad Hasan Khan
- Successor: Salim Khan

Khan of Shaki
- Reign: November 1806 – December 1806
- Predecessor: Salim Khan
- Successor: Jafar Qoli Khan Donboli
- Died: May 12, 1815; Shaki, Shaki Khanate, Russian Empire
- Burial: Shaki Khans' Mosque
- Issue: Karim agha Shakikhanov
- House: House of Black Monk
- Father: Muhammad Husayn Khan Mushtaq

Fatali Khan (Persian: فتحعلی خان) was the seventh khan of Shaki.

== Biography ==
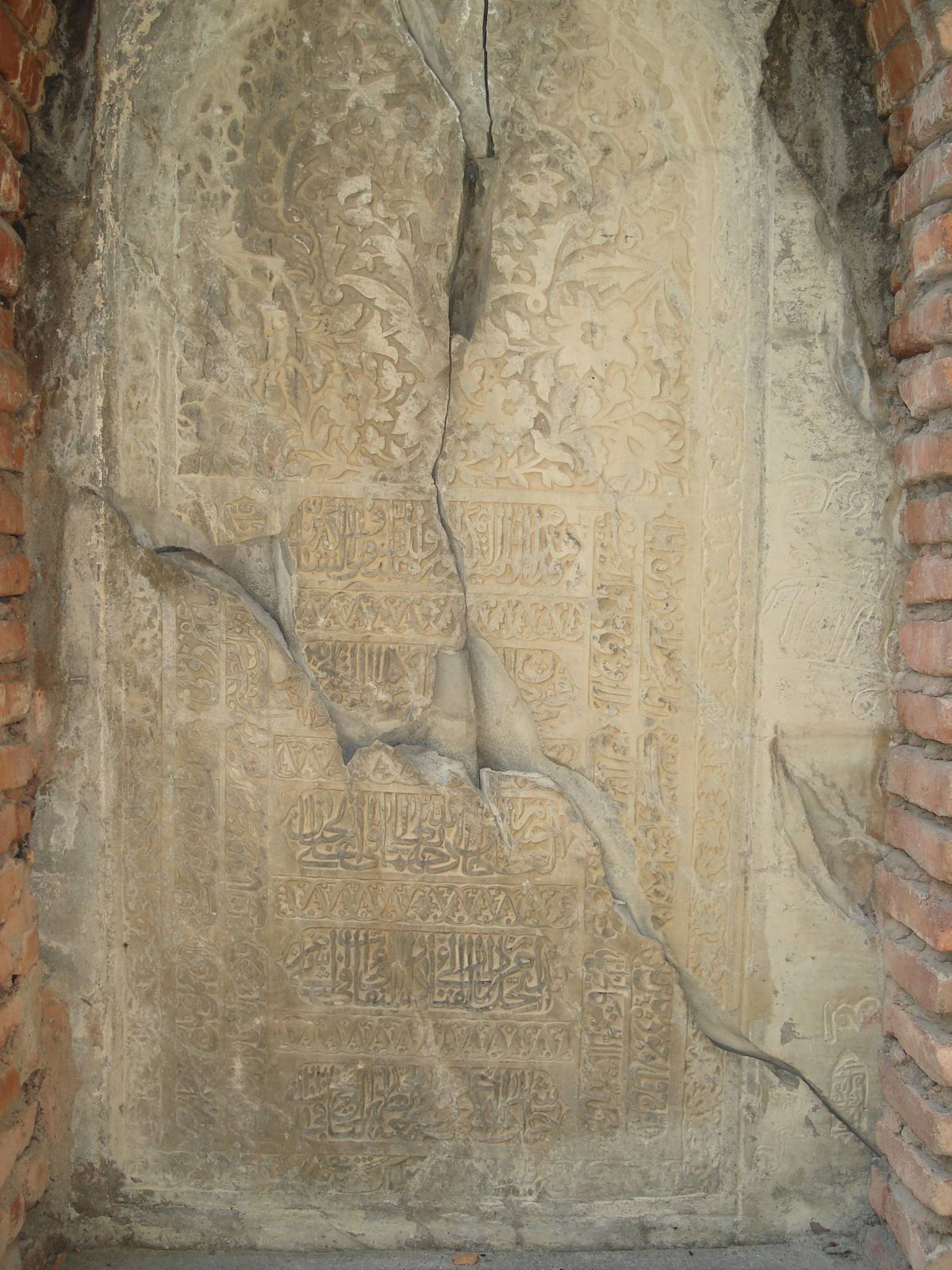
Gravestone of Fatali Khan

He was born to Muhammad Husayn Khan Mushtaq and daughter of Malik Ali, Sultan of Arash. He was still a child when he fought along his father against Haji Khan and witnessed his capture. He was blinded by his half-brother Muhammad Hasan Khan c. 1785 in order to prevent another civil war.

He was proclaimed a khan by local nobility in opposition to Mostafa Khan's designs in 1805. After reign of a month or so, he was forced to step down in favor of his half-brother Salim Khan.

He ruled Shaki for a second time, again briefly this time with certain Mammad beg on the orders of Ivan Gudovich. Reasoning for his appointment was his hatred of his half-brothers. He was soon replaced by Jafar Qoli Khan Donboli, former ruler of Tabriz and Khoy in 1806. He died on 12 May 1815 and buried in Khan cemetery near Shaki Khan's Mosque.

== Family ==
He was married to a certain Khurshid khanum from Quba and had one son, Karim agha Shakikhanov who authored "Brief History of Shaki Khans".
