= Karim agha Shakikhanov =

Azerbaijani poet and historian

- Born: 1788; Shaki, Shaki Khanate
- Died: 10 December 1858 (aged 70); Shaki, Russian Empire
- Other name: Fateh
- Occupations: Historian, Poet
- Notable work: Brief History of Shaki Khans
- Father: Fatali Khan

Karim agha Shakikhanov (Azerbaijani: Kərim ağa Şəkixanov, pen-name Fateh) was a poet and historian who wrote in Azerbaijani and Persian.

== Biography ==
He was born in 1788 to Fatali Khan and Khurshid khanum from Quba in Shaki, Shaki Khanate. He received private education in the palace, and had an excellent command of Arabic and Persian languages. He was described as a pious person by Firidun bey Kocharli and was included in his major academic work entitled Topics on the History of Azerbaijani Literature. He wrote mostly in Persian and also in his native Azerbaijani.

== Works ==
- Diwan — Now lost. Probably in Persian language.
- Ghazal dedicated to Prophet Muhammad.
- Ghazal in Azerbaijani.
- Brief History of Shaki Khans — written in Azerbaijani, included in Bernhard Dorn's "Excerpts from Muhammedan writers" in 1858. However he mistakenly attributed the book to some certain Haji Abdullatif Afandi, while Azerbaijani poet Salman Mumtaz concluded that in fact it was Karim Shakikhanov's work. It was republished in 1958, this time under the name of Karim agha. According to Azerbaijani historian Adalat Tahirzada, book might be commissioned by Ivan Paskevich - Russian general in Caucasus.

== Family ==
He had 4 sons (Abdulhamid, Mustafa, Ismail, Jafar and Gullu khanum and 1 daughter), some were buried in Shaki Khan's Mosque:

Name	Tombstone	Birth Date	Death Date	Relation
Karim agha Shakikhanov		c. 1788	10 December 1858	Himself
Mustafa agha Shakikhanov		c. 1831	5 November 1895	Son of Karim agha
Gullu khanum Shakikhanova			19 November 1858	Daughter of Karim agha
