= Haji Khan =

Haji khan

Khan of Shaki
- Reign: 1780–1783
- Predecessor: Muhammad Husayn Khan Mushtaq
- Successor: Muhammad Hasan khan
- Born: Abdulaziz
- Died: 21 December 1783
- Issue: 7 sons Bala Khanum – married to Daniyal Sultan of Elisu
- House: House of Black Monk
- Father: Haji Chalabi Khan

Haji Khan or Haji Abdulaziz Khan (Persian: حاجی عبدالعزیز خان) was the fourth khan of Shaki. He was described as a brave and courageous, but extremely ruthless man by Azerbaijani historian Abbasgulu Bakikhanov.

== Background ==
He was third son of Haji Chalabi Khan. He started a rebellion when his younger brother Jafar was killed by his nephew Muhammad Husayn Khan. He fled to a remote island where Alazani flew into Kura and set a rebel movement. He was allied to Ibrahim Khalil khan of Karabakh, Arash Mahal beys, Haji Chalabi's cousin Haji Rasul and other nobility members who were feeling grudge of because of the recent execution. When Muhammad Husayn sent his son Muhammad Hasan in seeking negotiation, Abdulaziz imprisoned him and sent to Karabakh ruler Ibrahim Khalil for execution.

== Reign ==
Haji Abdulaziz usurped the throne when he ambushed his niece in 1780 along with 70 men and invaded the khan's house, capturing him while killing his son Ahmad. Muhammad Husayn was forced to resign between 22 and 29 August and subsequently killed.

After three years, his relationship with Ibrahim Khalil khan deteriorated, who in turn sent Muhammad Hasan – who was not executed but kept as hostage – to conquer Shaki. Muhammad Hasan khan invaded Shaki in December. While Abdulaziz fled to Shirvan Khanate. Nevertheless, he was captured by Mustafa khan and handed over to Muhammad Hasan, who on 21 December 1783 killed Haji Abdulaziz khan along with his seven sons in revenge.
