= Pottery in Azerbaijan =

Pottery is one of the most ancient handicrafts in Azerbaijan.

== History ==
Pottery is one of the oldest areas of handicraft in Azerbaijan. This art appeared in the Neolithic Age. In ancient times women dominated this craft. In the Eneolite Age this became an independent art as a result of technical advances.

The Ethnography of Azerbaijan encyclopedia shows that pottery development accelerated from the end of the Middle Ages. The invention of foot-powered wheels increased the number of kinds of pottery products and the establishment of pottery centers. Demand for pottery products created favourable conditions for earthenware products. These products spread across Azerbaijan. Unglazed and glazed products were both made.

At the end of the eighteenth and beginning of the nineteenth century, the use of domestic ceramics was more developed. Potters were primarily many clay products for use as water vessels, cookware, etc.

Domestic pottery products were divided into several groups according to their usage. Water vessels pitchers, pots, jugs, vessels, doliums, carafes and mugs. Other earthenware products were used for washing and performing wudu.

=== Nakhchivan ===
During the Nakhchevan Khanate the workshop belonging to Ehsan Khan of Nakhchivan produced earthenware pitchers. Earthenware products were also produced in Shamakhi, Ardabil, Tabriz, Ganja and other cities. Clay dishes were produced in several villages of Sheki Khanate, especially in Nukha.

=== Baku ===
Pottery was also developed in Baku. The outskirts of the city were rich with clay, creating favourable production conditions. Bowls, plates and other artefacts from the seventeenth century were found there.

=== Karabakh ===
Pottery production in Karabakh reached a high level after the Early Middle Ages. Earthenware products in those times were much more developed in comparison with earlier or later work in terms of production mechanisms and decorative elements. Ceramic water pipes, tile and decorative bricks began in that period.

Mongol invasions caused heavy damage to pottery production along with other fields of handicrafts in Karabakh and in Azerbaijan as a whole.

=== Modern times ===
In modern times the pottery has three many lines: production of construction bricks; production of various clay dishes (tiles, clay pipe); production of faience and porcelain.

== Types ==
Pottery patterns are different in size, shape, materials and technologies. Types include Boralı ceramics, glossy ceramics, glazed ceramics, Basma-nakhıshlı ceramics and adhesion patterned ceramics. The different types were put to different applications:

- Pottery without glaze – cubes, boilers, cakes, sticks, aftershocks, cabbage, milk containers, spinach, lamps, hookahs.
- Pottery with glaze – drum, vase, vase, lamp, safe. In general, the glazed dishes in Karabakh were cooked in two stages: first, they cook the product in an ordinary way and take them out the fire, then made it with glaze, pushed back to cook.
- Construction materials – The glazed materials and ceramic mosaic were widely used during the construction of the Karabakh palace, caravanserai and baths.

== also ==
lanka
