= Fath-Ali Khan =

Fath-Ali Khan:

- Fath-Ali Khan Afshar (1700—1763), khan of the Urmia Khanate (1747—1748).
- Fath-Ali Khan Qajar (1686—1726), chieftain of Astarabad (1720—1726).
- Fath-Ali Khan of Quba (1736—1789), khan of the Quba Khanate (1758—1789).
- Fath-Ali Khan Saba (1765—1822/1823), court poet
- Fath-Ali Khan Daghestani (1694—1722), Grand Vizier of the Safavid Iran (1716—1720).
- Fath-Ali Khan of Shaki (died 1815), khan of the Shaki Khanate (1805).

== See also ==
- Fath Ali Khan Khoiski (1875—1920), Azerbaijani and Russian statesman.
