= Darvish Mohammad Khan =

Darvish Mohammed Khan
- Khan of Shaki
- Reign: 1524–1551
- Predecessor: Hasan Sultan
- Successor: Bagi beg
- Died: May 1551; Shaki, near Galarsan-Gorarsan
- Spouse: Pari Khan Khanum
- Issue: Bagi beg
- House: House of Black Monk
- Father: Hasan Sultan
- Religion: Islam

Darvish Mohammad Khan was the Khan of Sheki, ruling from 1524 to 1551. He ascended the throne after his father's assassination in May of 1524.

In 1538, he helped Shahrukh of Shirvan against the Safavids but without success so he retreated back to Shaki. The next year he married Pari Khan Khanum, daughter of the Safavid Shah Tahmasp I. He sent his son Bagi beg as a hostage to the Safavid court. In 1551 Tahmasp I started an invasion of Shaki along with the Georgian king Levan of Kakheti. The result of the massive invasion was the death of Darvish Mohammad Khan and the devastation of the castles Galarsan-Gorarsan and Kish. Shaki was given to Toygun beg Qajar. Khan's son Bagi beg was held as prisoner in Shah Tahmasp I's court.

== See also ==
- Shaki Khanate
- Shaki, Azerbaijan
