= Hasan Sultan =

Khan of Shaki from 1519 to 1524

- Khan of Shaki
- Reign: 1519-1524
- Predecessor: Zaki khan
- Successor: Darvish Mohammed Khan
- Born: c. 1497 ?
- Died: 1524; Padar-Chala
- Burial: 41°N 47°E
- Issue: Darvish Mohammed Khan; Shahnezer Sultan
- Dynasty: House of Black Monk
- Father: Zaki khan
- Religion: Muslim

Hasan Sultan was khan of Shaki. His reign period is not much known. According to a Persian source he was of House of Black Monk.

He was attacked by Levan of Kakheti in 1521. Levan was soon punished by Ismail I who sent his troops under command of Div Sultan Rumlu. He was assassinated in 1524.
