= Agha Kishi Beg =

Aghakishi beg

Khan of Shaki
- Reign: 1755–1759
- Predecessor: Haji Chalabi Khan
- Successor: Muhammad Husayn khan Mushtaq
- Died: 1759
- House: House of Black Monk
- Father: Haji Chalabi Khan

Agha Kishi Beg (Persian: آقا کیشی بیگ) was the khan of the Shaki Khanate from 1755 to 1759.

Agha Kishi Beg was a son of Haji Chalabi Khan, the khan of Shaki and a grandson of the priest of the former church of Kish. In 1755, Haji Chalabi Khan died and was succeeded by his Agha Kishi Beg. In addition to fortifying the town of Shaki, Agha Kishi Beg carried on his father's policy of maintaining cordial ties with the nearby khanates of Shirvan and Quba. Agha Kishi Beg married the daughter of the Qazi-Qomuq chief in Daghestan, Mohammad Khan. In 1759, Agha Kishi Beg was persuaded to a meeting where he was killed by Mohammad Khan and the latters ally Soltan Ali, a well-known local figure. A grandson of Hajji Chalabi Khan, Muhammad Husayn Khan Mushtaq, was sent away to safety in Shirvan by the dignitaries of the Shaki khanate. He came back some months later, expelled the Qazi-Qomuq, and reinstated his family's rule in Shaki.

== Sources ==
- Bournoutian, George (2021). From the Kur to the Aras: A Military History of Russia's Move into the South Caucasus and the First Russo-Iranian War, 1801–1813. Brill. ISBN 978-90-04-44515-4.
- Minorsky, Vladimir & Bosworth, Clifford Edmund (1997). "S̲h̲akkī". In Bosworth, C. E.; van Donzel, E.; Heinrichs, W. P. & Lecomte, G. (eds.). The Encyclopaedia of Islam, Second Edition. Volume IX: San–Sze. Leiden: E. J. Brill. ISBN 978-90-04-10422-8.
