= Salim Khan (Shaki khan) =

Khan of Shaki
- Reign: 1795–1797
- Predecessor: Muhammad Hasan Khan
- Successor: Muhammad Hasan Khan

Khan of Shaki
- Reign: 1805–1806
- Predecessor: Fatali Khan
- Successor: Fatali Khan
- Died: April 12, 1826; Kırşehir, Ottoman Empire
- House: House of Black Monk
- Father: Muhammad Husayn Khan Mushtaq

Salim Khan (Persian: سلیم خان) was the sixth khan of Shaki. He was described as kind and joyful, but unmerciful man by Abbasgulu Bakikhanov.

== Early years ==
He was born to Muhammad Husayn khan Mushtaq and a sister of Pyotr Bagration. He was first mentioned as a rebel lord against his half-brother Muhammad Hasan Khan. He fled to Djaro-Belokani in 1784/1785. He later occupied Shaki when Muhammad Hasan travelled to visit new Qajar shah Agha Muhammad in Karabakh on November or December 1795. While Salim Khan lost the battle near Goynuk, a sudden arrest of Muhammad Hasan by Mostafa khan Davalu (a general under Agha Muhammad) on the charge of treason, led him to re-occupy Shaki using the opportunity. He was supported by Djaro-Belokani noble Aliskandar Huzzati. Muhammad Hasan khan was blinded by Qajars and sent to Tabriz as hostage, meanwhile his 7 underage sons were executed by Salim Khan.

== First reign ==
His first reign started on November–December 1795. He submitted to Valerian Zubov in July–August 1796. However, abrupt end of Russian expedition in Caucasus and Agha Mohammad's new campaign in 1797 forced him to flee again on 9 May 1797. He struggled to take throne back and sought help who was now supported by Mustafa khan, however instead of battling, Muhammad Hasan surrendered himself to Mustafa khan, who spared him and sent viceroys to govern Shaki as a part of Shirvan. While Salim Khan informed his brother Fatali of this betrayal, locals enthroned Fatali Khan instead of Muhammad Hasan and Salim in defiance of Shirvan.

== Second reign ==
He forced Fatali Khan to resign shortly in 1805 and defeated Mustafa khan with support from Tsitsianov who sent him 300 soldiers. Finally, he submitted to Russian authority on 2 June 1805 and soon was awarded with general-lieutenant rank on the order of Alexander I. He later mediated Mustafa khan's submission as well, forcing him to be Russian subject on 6 January 1806. After Tsitsianov's murder in Baku on 20 February and massacre of Ibrahim Khalil Khan's family (which also included Salim Khan's sister) by Russians on 2 June 1806, Salim Khan expelled the Russian garrison from Shaki on 24 June 1806. Russian general Pyotr Nebolsin attacked on November as retaliation and routed 8000 strong Shaki army composed of Dagestani mercenaries as well. According to Bakikhanov, he was paid by Qajar prince Abbas Mirza to secure mercenaries.

== Life in exile ==
Salim khan fled to Iran in 1806 while he was succeeded by Fatali Khan in Shaki. He lived in Meshgin Shahr sometime around 1818 according to Mirza Fatali Akhundov and then in Tabriz, ultimately immigrating to Ottoman Empire. He initially petitioned to seek asylum and be appointed as a governor of Akhaltshikhe, sending his ambassador Muhammad Chalabi to Mahmud II. While he was granted asylum in Erzurum, he was not allowed to reside in Childir, Kars or Baghdad for security purposes. He soon fell out of favor for his demands to include his family members in Iran to be relocated to Erzurum and removed to Ankara in 1822. Salim Khan soon sent more requests, demanding more pensions, a visit to Constantinople and relocation to Bursa, which was denied by the Porte. He died on his way to Hajj on 12 April 1826 near Kırşehir.

== Family ==
He was married to Tuti Begim, daughter of Ibrahim Khalil khan of Karabakh, having issues:

1. Huseyn Khan – Khan for a brief time in 1826.
2. Haji Khan – Governor of Kermanshah in Qajar Iran. Later founded Hajikhanlou subtribe of Shahsevan.
3. Suleyman Khan – Podpolkovnik in Imperial Russian Army.
4. Fakhrunnisa Khanum – Married to Mahmud agha.
5. Asiya begum.
