= Shakikhanovs' Palace =

Shakikhanov's House
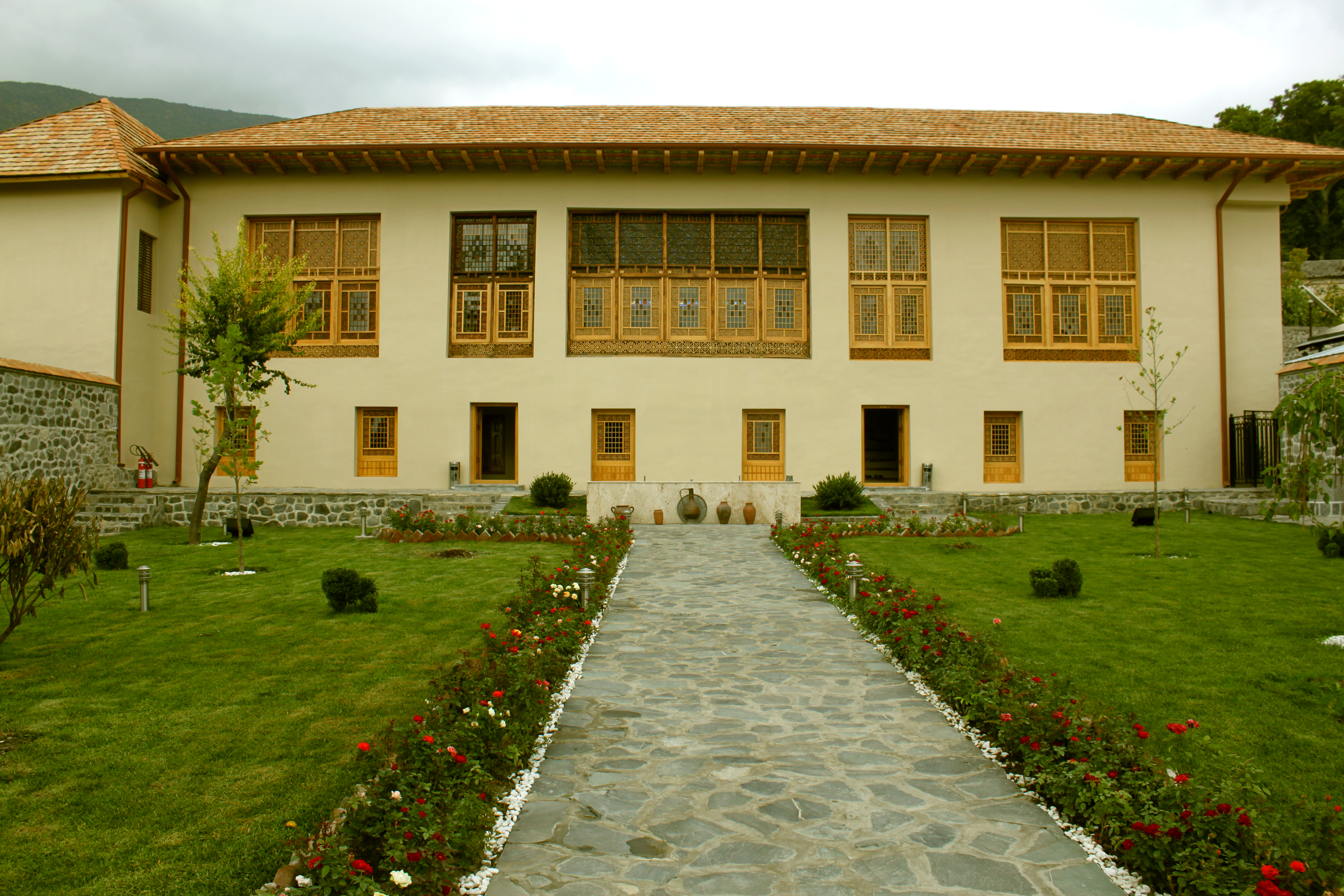
- Interactive map of the Shakikhanov's House area

General information
- Status: Museum
- Type: Palace
- Architectural style: Architecture of Azerbaijan
- Location: Shaki, Azerbaijan
- Completed: 18th century
- Client: Shekikhanov's family
- Owner: Upper Main State Historical-Architectural Reserve

Shakikhanov's house or Shakikhanov's palace, is a monument of Azerbaijani architecture, located in the Sheki preserve area.

== Style ==
The structure is a mixture between the standard vernacular of homes in the area and a palace. A two-storied building with a long, rectangular shape is similar to palace buildings, while the interior decorative elements are more in the style of the interior of Sheki houses.

Each floor consists of three rooms and two small corridors. The rooms on the first floor have winter halls, where "bukharis" (fireplaces) are placed. The second floor, similar to the first floor, is designed for guests.

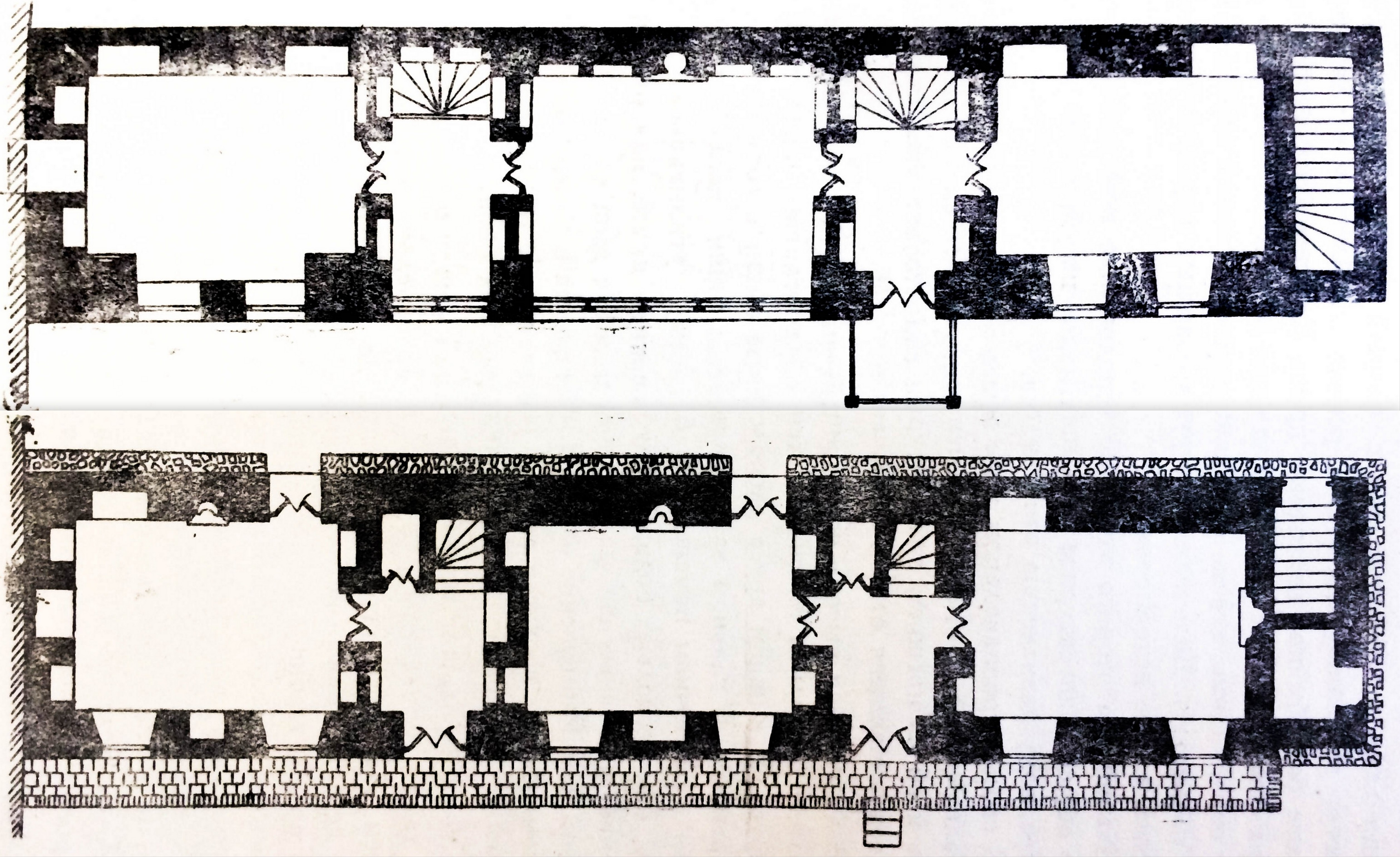
Plan of Shekikhanov's Palace

In the second floor interior, the main flooring is a decorative vine. Rectangular boards cover the walls. Wall painting subjects include Persian poet Nizami's heroes, "Seven Beauties", "Leyli and Majnun" poems and covered with a very unusual stalactite. Two types of cabinets are used. The ceiling and the cavities of the three walls pass through the shelves. Small boards are on the shelves. The sockets are decorated with flowers, animal and bird pictures in the vases. The rest of the hall, except the outer wall, is designed with a drawing ornamented "network".

== Gallery ==
=== Architecture ===
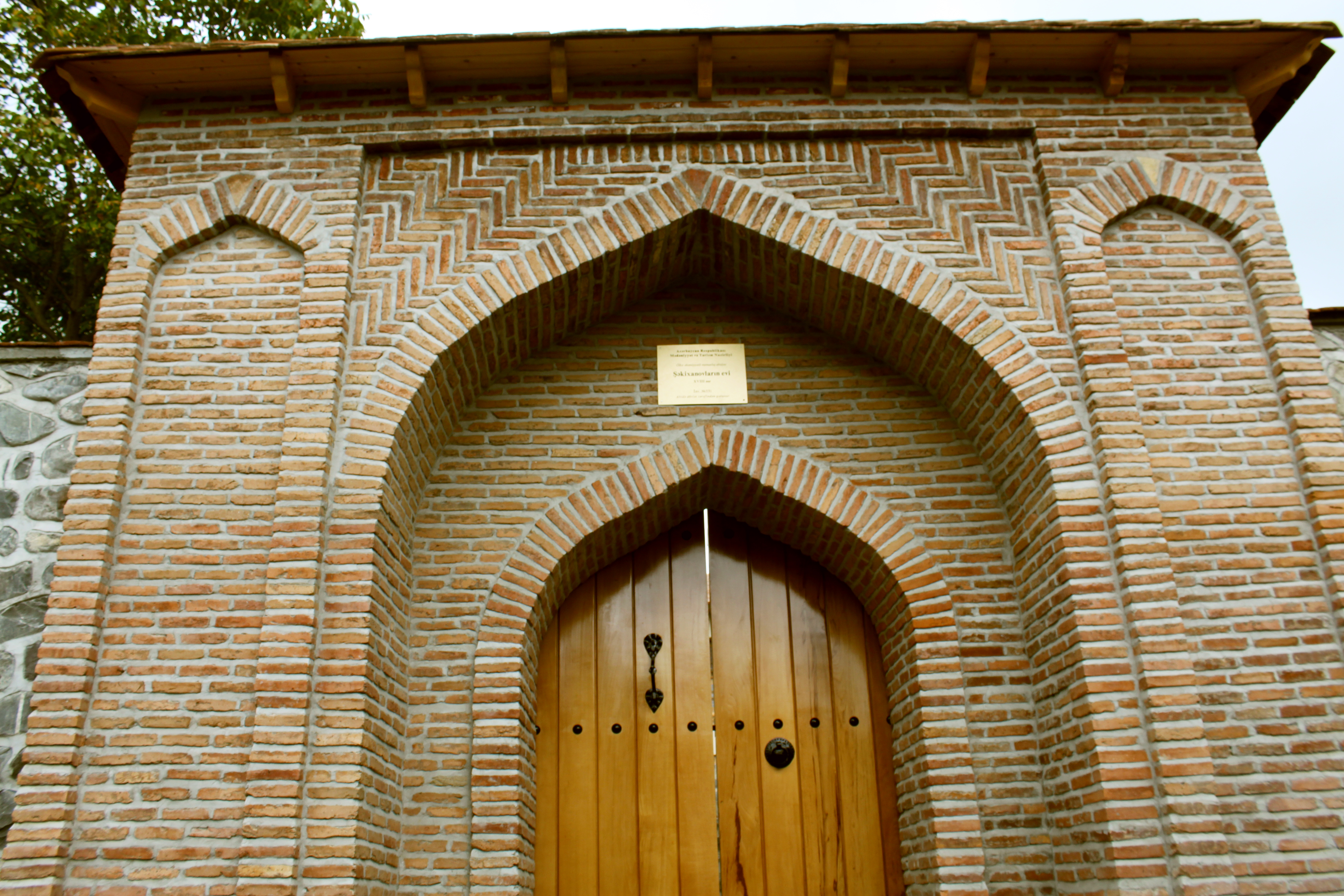

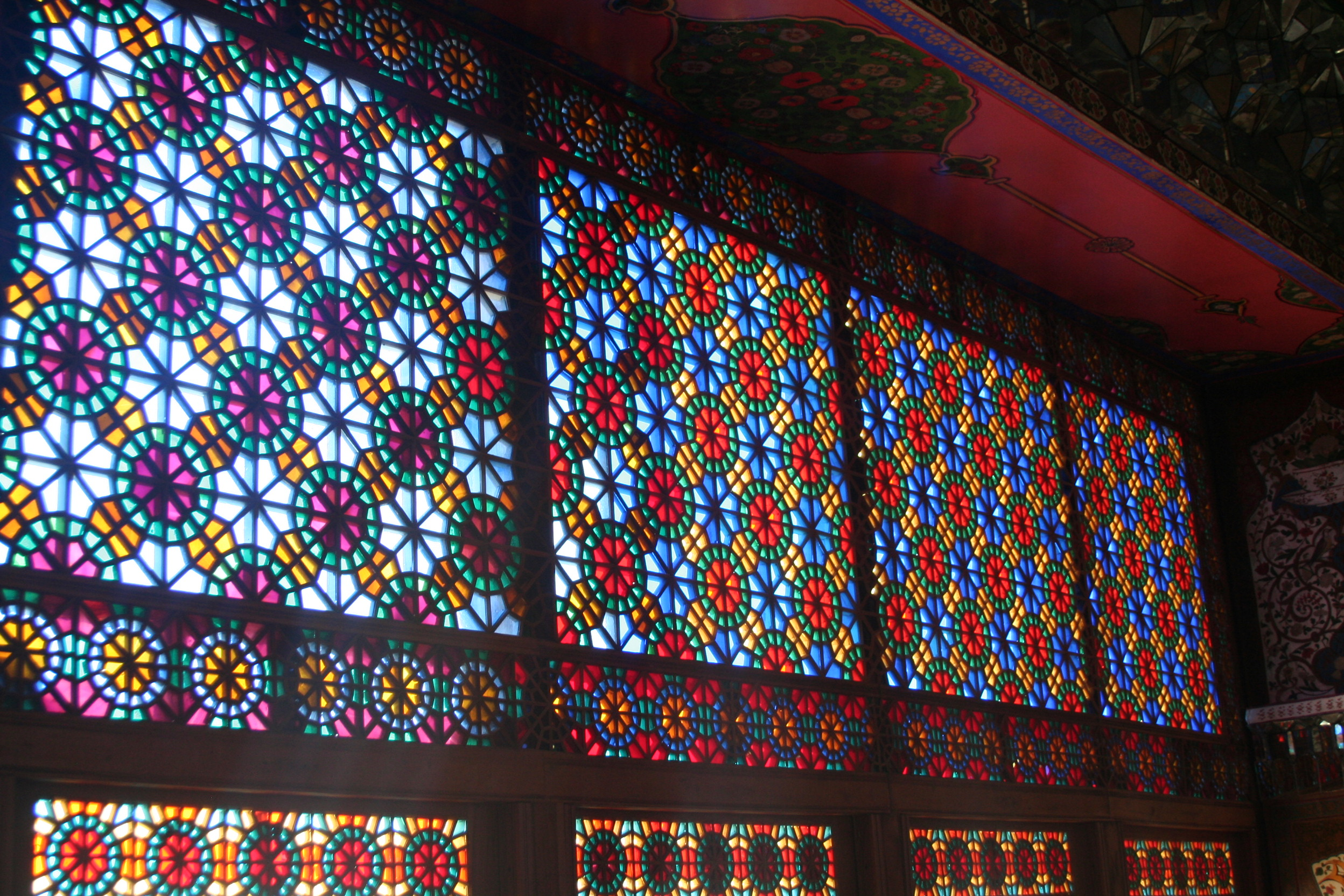

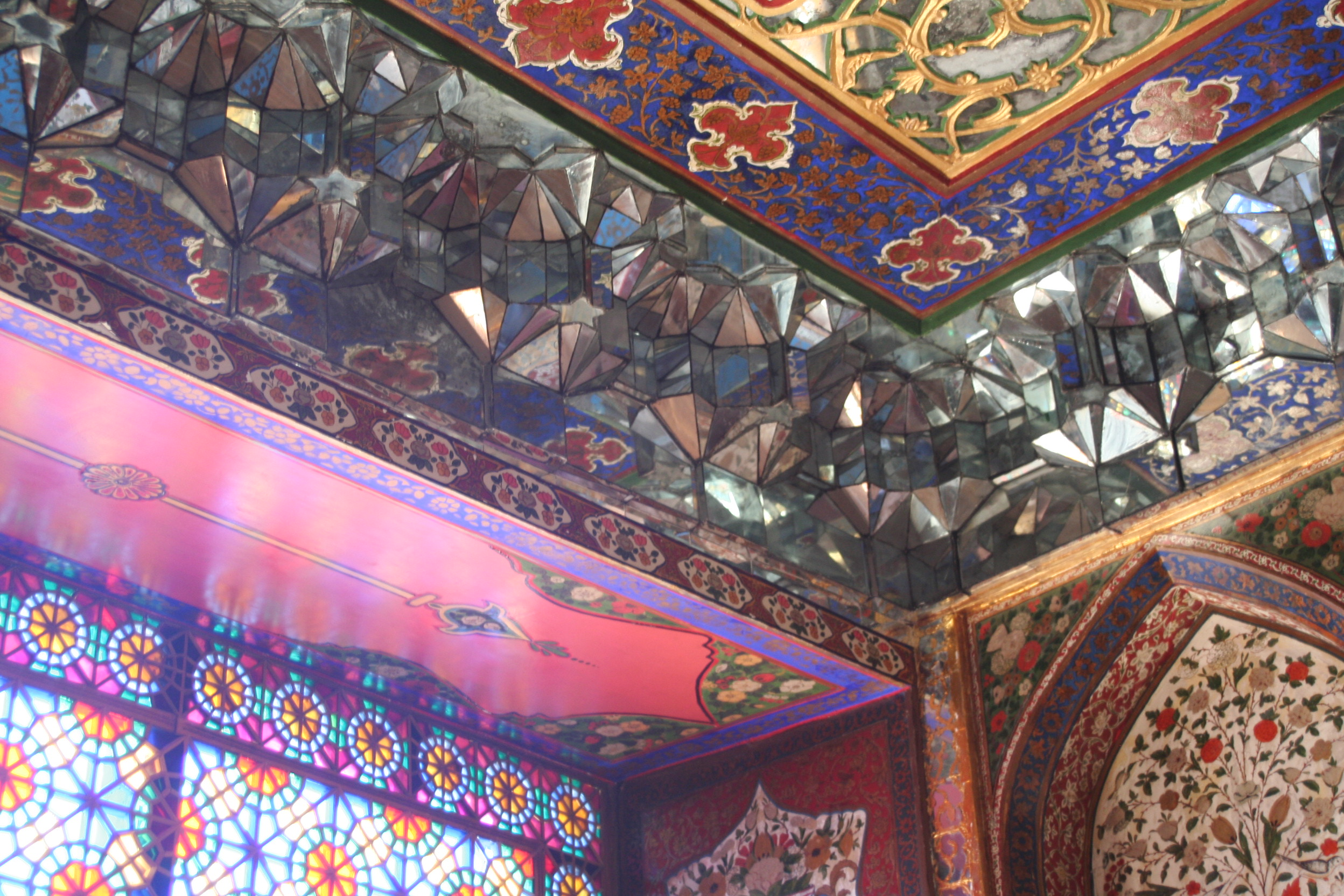

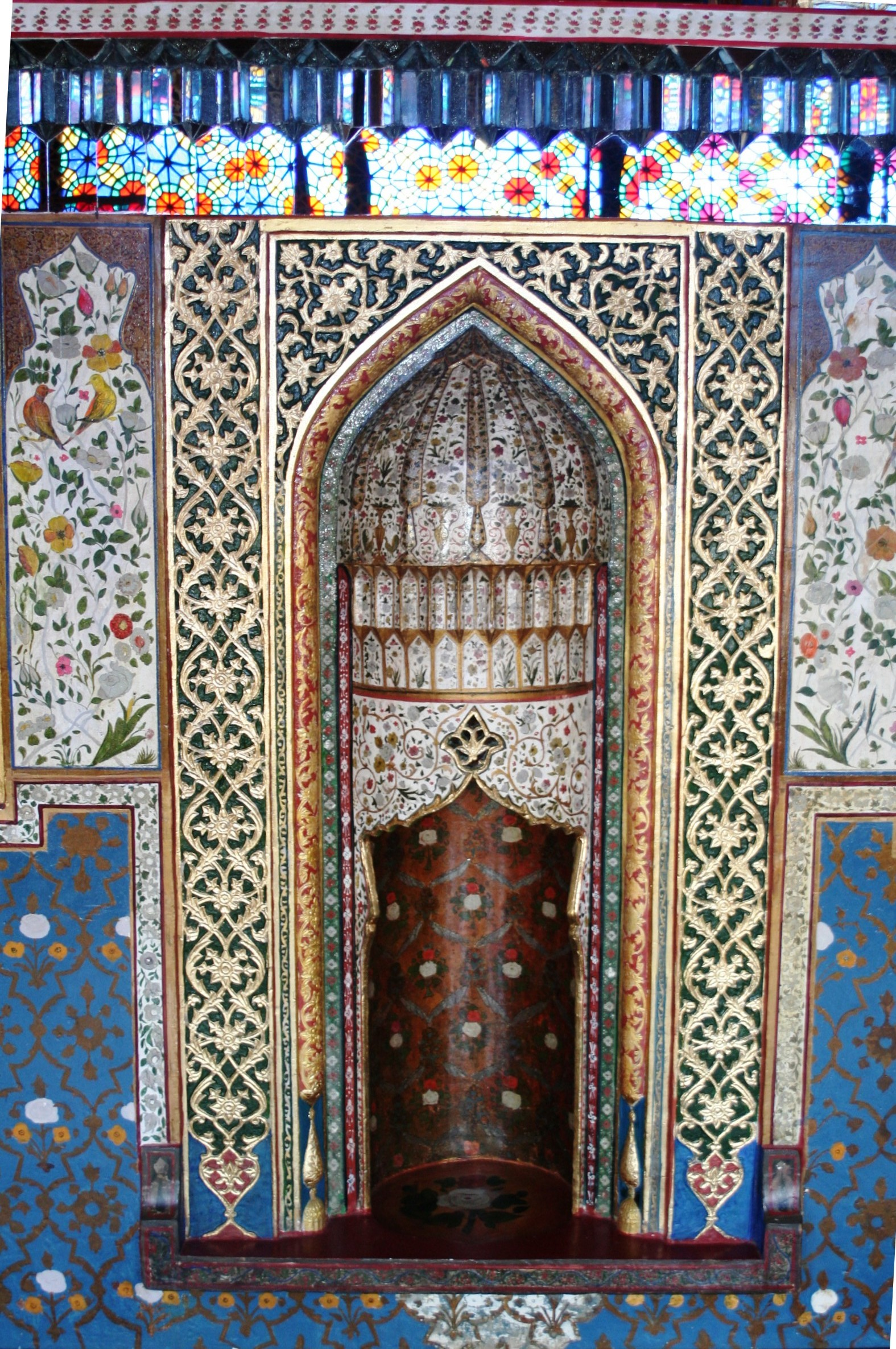

=== Wall paintings ===
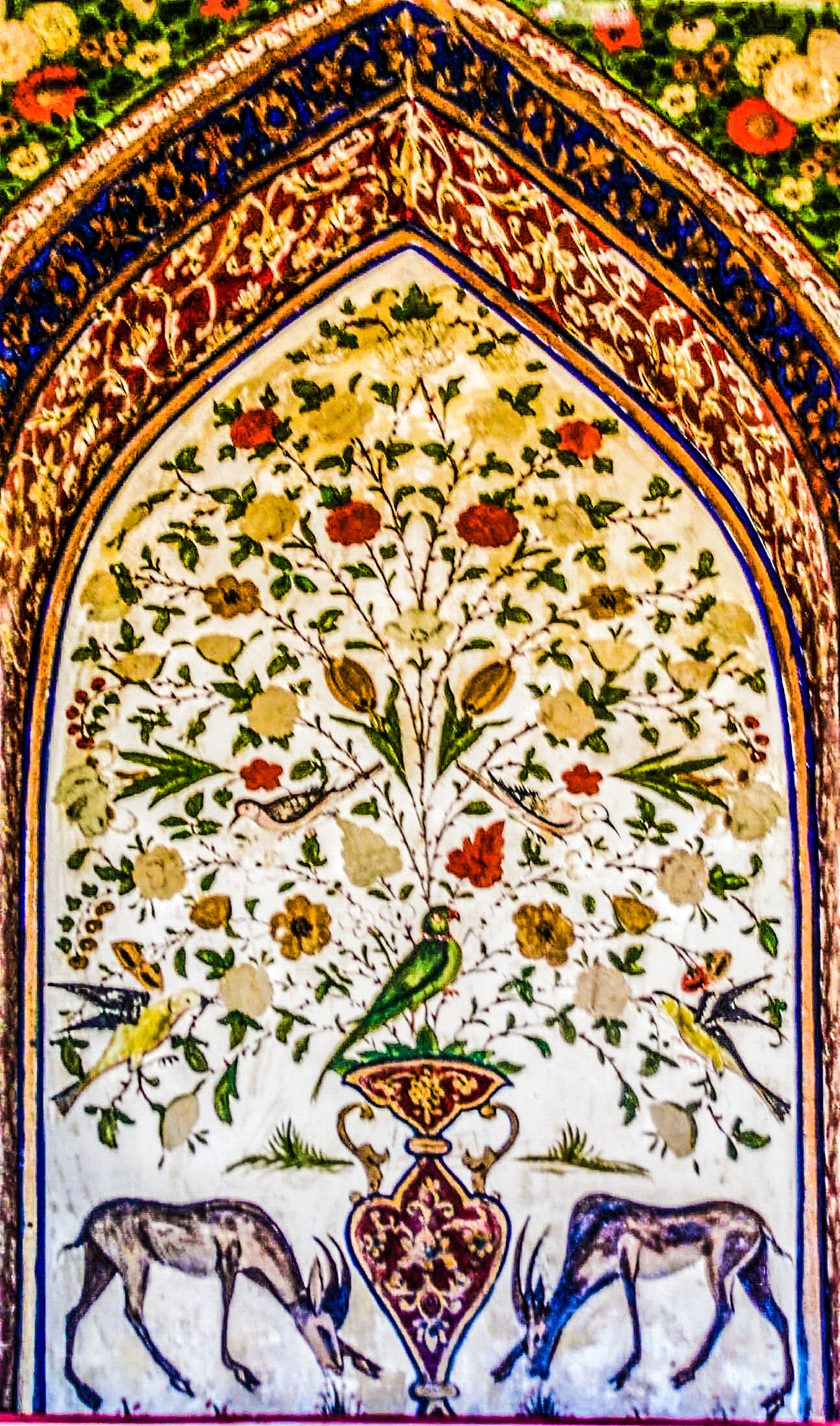

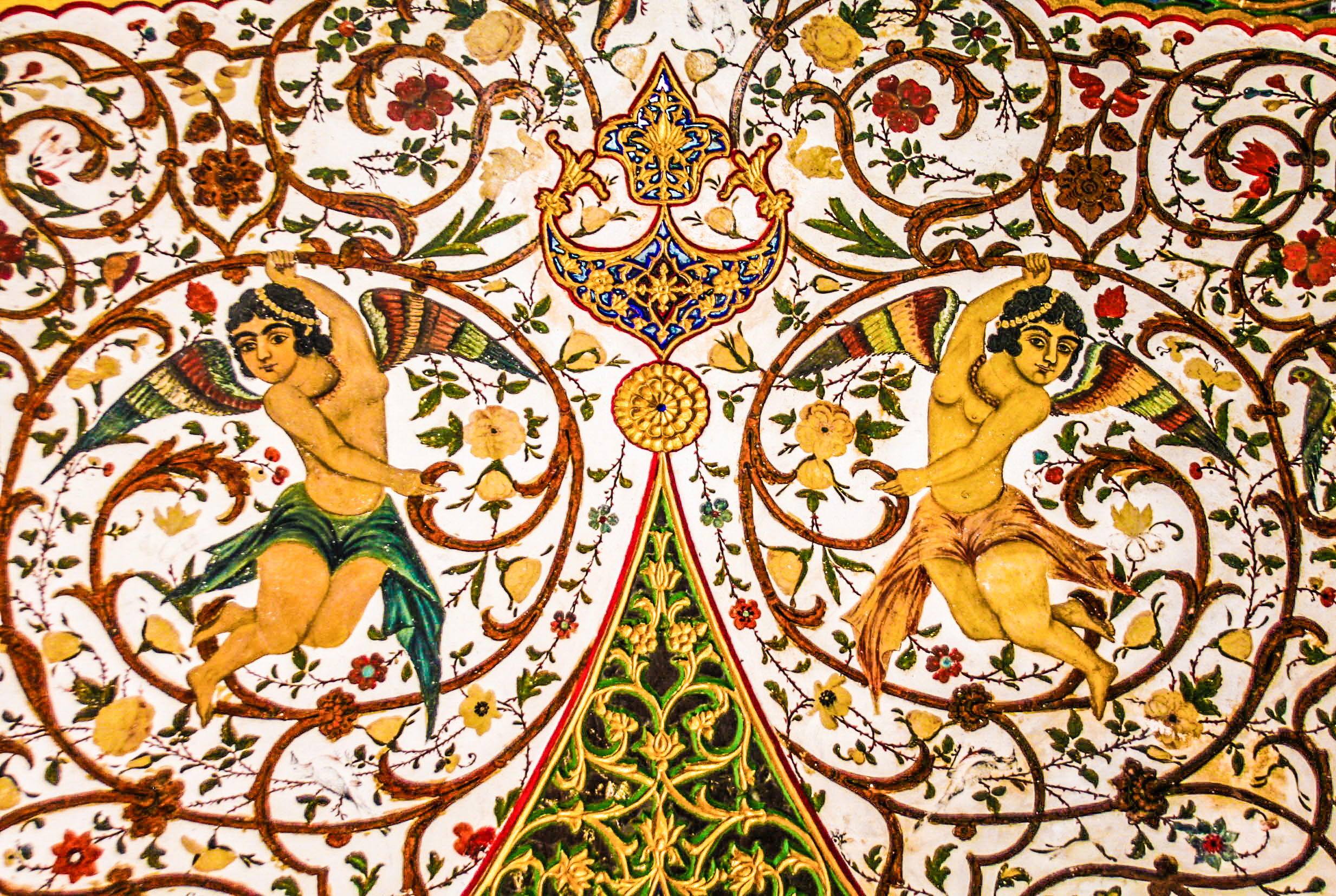

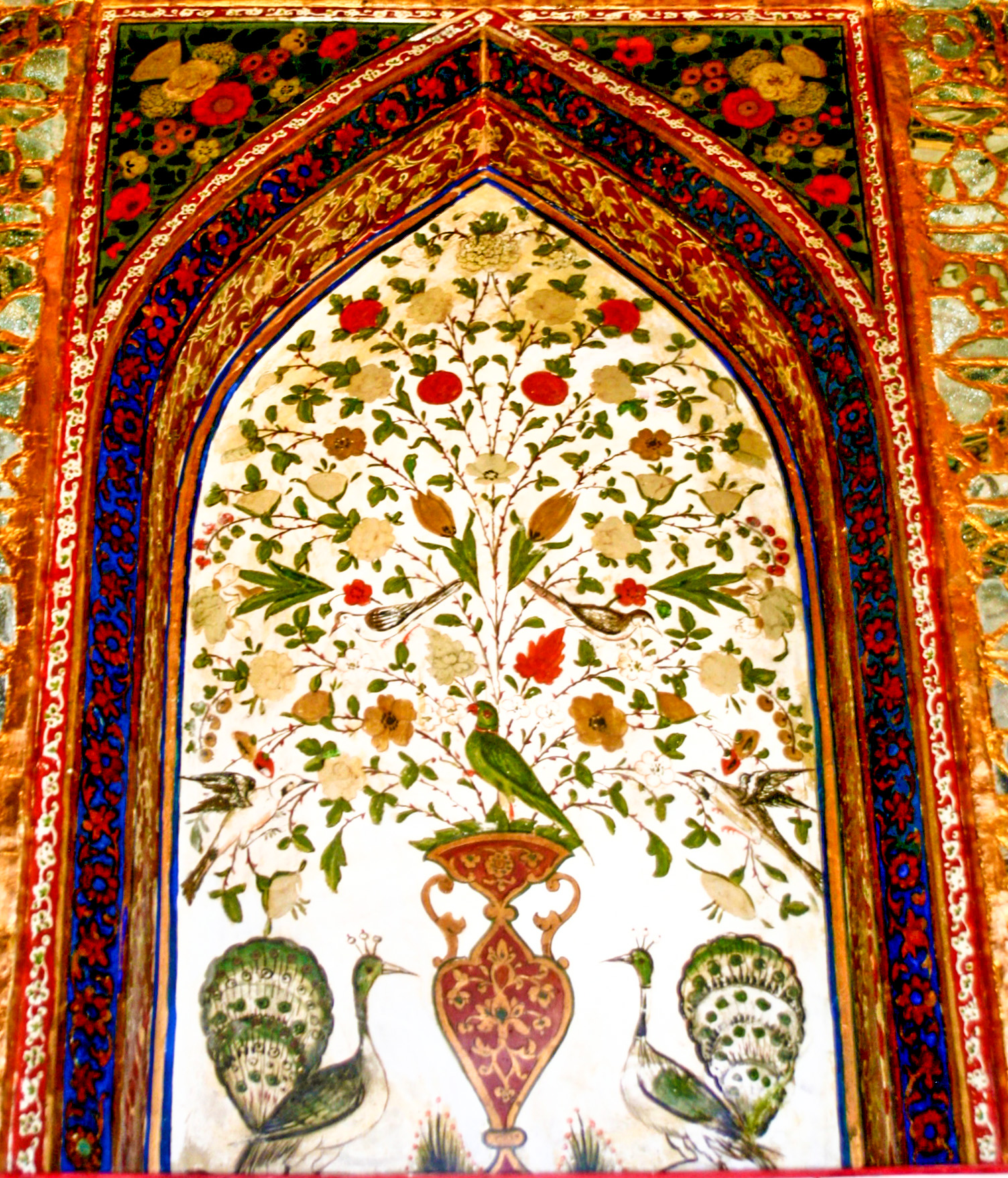

== See also ==
- Shaki Khanate
- Palace of Shaki Khans
- Shaki
