= House of Black Monk =

- Founded: c. 13th century
- Final ruler: Salim Khan
- Titles: Khan of Shaki
- Estates: Shakikhanovs' Palace; Palace of Shaki Khans
- Deposition: 1806

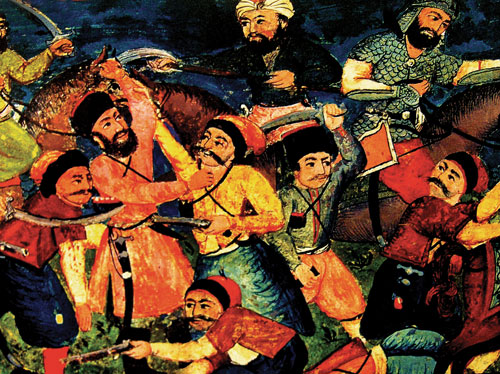
Miniature on the wall of Khan's Palace of Shaki

The House of Black Monk was the ruling dynasty of the Shaki Khanate. It was first reported by Karim agha Shakikhanov, a scion of dynasty, in his Brief History of Shaki Khans written in Azerbaijani, included in Bernhard Dorn's "Excerpts from Muhammedan writers" in 1858. However he mistakenly attributed the book to some certain Haji Abdullatif Afandi, while Azerbaijani poet Salman Mumtaz concluded that in fact it was Karim Shakikhanov's work. It was republished in 1958, this time under the name of Karim agha. According to Azerbaijani historian Adalat Tahirzada, book might be commissioned by Ivan Paskevich - Russian general in Caucasus.

== History ==
According to the legend, the progenitor of this house was a Christian (probably Armenian or Udi) monk living in Nukha. He married his son to a daughter of another priest serving in Kish. The monk's son, Jandar later converted to Islam, receiving the name "Alijan" (lit. 'Soul of Ali'). According to another scion of the dynasty, Mustafa agha Shakikhanov, Jandar's grandson Zaki Khan captured Arbatan plains and the city of Nukha. His son was reportedly Hasan Sultan, who was attacked by Levan of Kakheti in 1521 and killed in 1524 in a battle with him. A much better known member of the family was his son, Darvish Mohammad Khan. After Safavid incorporation of Shaki, Darvish's son Bagi beg was sent to Tahmasp I's court as hostage, khanate was converted to district and given to Toygun beg Qajar (1551–1555).

The family wouldn't rise to prominence until Hajji Chalabi - who was born to a certain landlord Gurban beg during the reign of Sultan Husayn in 1703, he was of noble birth. Brockhaus and Efron Encyclopedic Dictionary cites a legend of "Black Monk" calling him the grandson of an Armenian priest who converted to Islam. Biographer Haji Seyid Abdulhamid mentions him as a 7th generation descendant of Darvish Mohammad Khan. Petrushevsky also thought of him being either Udi or Armenian origin. Hajji Chalabi established himself as lord of Shaki in 1747 after murder of Nader Shah. Family ruled the khanate until 1806 when Salim Khan was deposed by Russians. Salim Khan's son Huseyn Khan attempted to regain the khanate during Russo-Persian War of 1826–1828 and ruled briefly - 80 days.

Their current descendants use Shakikhanov and Shakinski surnames. Famous people hailing from the family was Soviet film actress Barat Shakinskaya, historian Karim agha Shakikhanov, police general Emin Shakinski, head of Baku City Police Mamed Shakinski.

== Sources ==
- Minorsky, Vladimir & Bosworth, Clifford Edmund (1997). "S̲h̲akkī". In Bosworth, C. E.; van Donzel, E.; Heinrichs, W. P. & Lecomte, G. (eds.). The Encyclopaedia of Islam, Second Edition. Volume IX: San–Sze. Leiden: E. J. Brill. ISBN 978-90-04-10422-8.
