= Kazem Khan of Qaradagh =

Kazem Khan (Persian: کاظم خان) was a local chieftain in Qaradagh during the early 18th-century.

It is uncertain which Qaradaghi tribe Kazem Khan was part of. Qaradagh was the only district in the Azerbaijan province in which Nader Shah's expulsion of the populace does not appear to have occurred. In the 1720s, when the Ottoman Empire was occupying Azerbaijan, Kazem Khan fought against them. He was eventually named governor of Qaradagh after participating in the Battle of Yeghevard in 1735 as one of Nader Shah's officers; however, he later provoked Nader Shah's resentment and was blinded. Despite this impairment, he gathered the local tribes following Nader Shah's death in 1747 and tried to increase his power by forming alliances.

Kazem Khan was one of the last to capitulate to Karim Khan Zand in 1763 and was taken hostage along with others to the city of Shiraz. His eventual fate is unknown, but by the 1780s, his son Mostafa-qoli (?) Khan had succeeded him and carried on the family's allegiance to the Qajar tribe.

== Sources ==
- Tapper, Richard (1997). Frontier Nomads of Iran: A Political and Social History of the Shahsevan. Cambridge University Press. ISBN 978-0-52158-336-7.
