= Abbasgulu =

Abbasgulu (Azerbaijani: Abbasqulu) is an Azerbaijani masculine given name. Notable people with the name include:

- Abbasgulu Bakikhanov (1794–1847), Azerbaijani writer, historian, journalist, linguist, poet and philosopher
- Abbasgulu bey Shadlinski (1886–1930), Soviet military leader and revolutionary
- Abbasgulu Kazimzade (1882–1947), Azerbaijani politician
