= Haji Chalabi Khan =

Khan of Shaki
- Reign: 1743 – 1755
- Successor: Aghakishi beg
- Born: Chalabi; 1703; Nukha, Safavid Empire
- Died: 1755 (aged 51–52)
- House: House of Black Monk
- Father: Qurban beg

Haji Chalabi Khan (1703 – 1755), was a statesman, warlord, ruler and founder of Shaki Khanate.

== Origin ==
Born to a certain landlord Gurban beg during the reign of Sultan Husayn in 1703, he was of noble birth. Biographer Haji Seyid Abdulhamid mentions him as a 7th generation descendant of Darvish Mohammad Khan, last khan of Shaki before Safavid Invasion of Shirvan. Petrushevsky also thought of him being either Udi or Armenian origin. There are also some indications that he may have been descended from Shirvanshahs.

== Rebellion against Nader Shah ==
He was supported by locals in opposition to corrupt Afsharid appointed viceroy Malik Najaf. His name was frequently mentioned in annals regarding to Nader Shah's Dagestan campaign. He was confirmed by Nader as an overseer to check corruption of Malik Najaf. However viceroy protested against it, causing locals to rebel. In course of rebellion, despite losing 500 families to Nader, Chalabi managed to murder Malik Najaf in 1743. To punish disobedience, Nader attacked Shaki in 1744 and sieged the Galarsan-Gorarsan fortress where Haji Chalabi took refuge. The name of the fortress Gələrsən Görərsən which means in Azerbaijani language "Come and see" derives from the historic episode related to the siege. When Nader Shah sent an ultimatum to surrender, Chalabi sent a response letter saying "Come and see". Outraged shah ordered to destroy the rest of the town. He successfully defended against a second attack from Nader in February 1745. However he submitted to Nader in March 1746, asking for forgiveness. Nader approved his submission and forgave him, appointing Malik Najaf's nephew Malik Jafar as new governor and Haji Chalabi as his overseer.

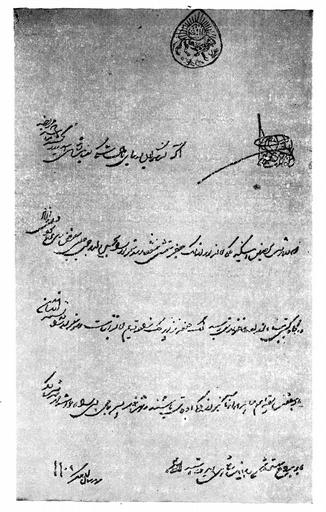
Firman of Nadir Shah, which answers a petition by the inhabitants of Shakki, who requested that the local ruler Ja'far should be replaced by the former rebel Haji Chalabi. The request is turned down and the inhabitants are ordered to accept the authority of Ja'far.

== Reign ==
He declared his independence as the khan when Nader was murdered in 1747. Using power vacuum, Chalabi raided south as far as Tabriz and became a major power in the region with strong army. His first target was Karabakh in 1748, where he made an alliance of Melikdoms of Karabakh and rival branches of Javanshir clan, although nothing came out of it. Alarmed local rulers, namely Panah khan of Karabakh, Heydargulu khan of Nakhchivan, Shahverdi khan of Ganja, Kazim khan of Karadagh concluded alliance against Shaki Khanate. They were invited by Teimuraz II who wished to join their alliance, but in fact capturing them as hostages, demanding tributes. Having received the news, Chalabi khan and his army rushed to the aid of their former enemies. His forces prevailed in the battle against Georgian prince Heraclius in June 1752 near Aghstafa river and routed them to Tbilisi. Chalabi khan appointed his son Aghakishi beg as viceroy to newly conquered territories of Ganja, Kazakh and Borchali. Subsequently, in 1755, in an attempt to establish his hegemony over the Shirvan Khanate, Haji Chalabi was defeated by Huseynali khan of Quba and the result of this defeat was the decline of the power of Sheki Khanate. Chalabi died same year from an illness.

== Religious policy ==
He was a zealous ruler and known to be imposed a double tax on Udi population called "din ipəyi". Gilahli Mosque was built on the order of Haji Chalabi in 1749.

== Family ==
He had four sons:

- Hasan agha - died in battle against Amir Aslan khan of Afsharid army
- Aghakishi beg - viceroy of Ganja and next khan of Shaki.
- Abdulgadir khan
- Jafar agha

== See also ==
- Khanates of the Caucasus
