= Shaki Khan's Mosque =

Mosque in Shaki, Azerbaijan

- Azerbaijani: Şəki xan Məscidi; Persian: مسجد شکی خان
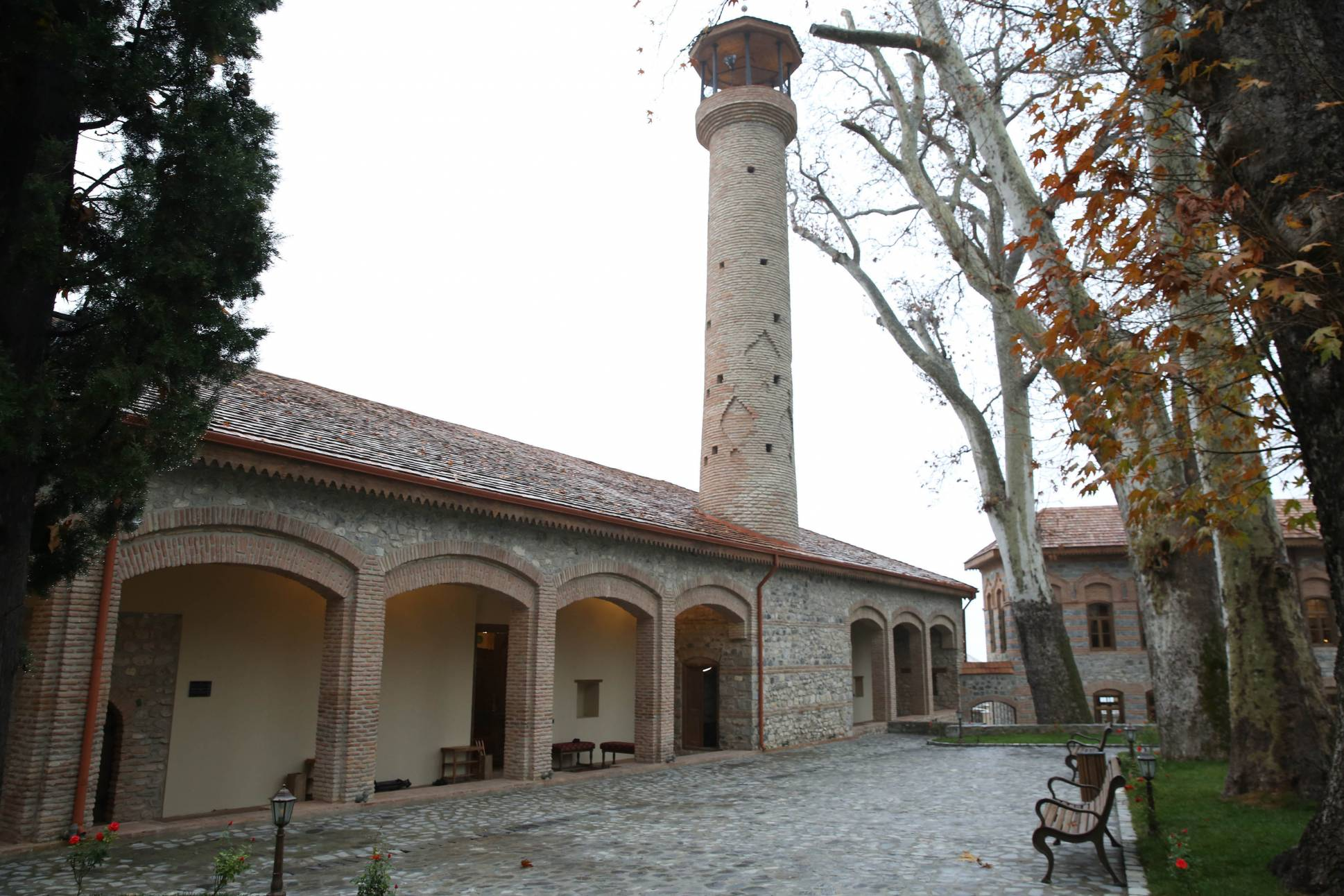
- The mosque in 2022, following restoration

- Location of the mosque in Azerbaijan

Religion
- Affiliation: Islam
- Ecclesiastical or organisational status: Mosque (1770–1928); Profane use (1928–1991); Mosque (since 2022)
- Status: Active

Location
- Location: Shaki
- Country: Azerbaijan
- Coordinates: 41°12′N 47°11′E

Architecture
- Type: Mosque architecture
- Completed: 1183 AH (1769/1770 CE)

Specifications
- Length: 45 m (148 ft)
- Width: 10 m (33 ft)
- Minaret: One
- Minaret height: 21 m (69 ft)

UNESCO World Heritage Site
- Official name: "Khan's Palace, Sheki's Historical Center"
- Criteria: Cultural: (ii), (v)
- Designated: 2019 (43rd Session)
- Reference no.: 1549

The Shaki Khan's Mosque (Azerbaijani: Şəki xan Məscidi, Persian: مسجد شکی خان), previously the First Khan Mosque (Azerbaijani: Birinci xan Məscidi, Persian: مسجد اول خان), is an 18th-century mosque located in the city of Shaki, Azerbaijan.

The mosque was included in the list of local historical and cultural monuments by the decision No. 132 of the Cabinet of Ministers of the Republic of Azerbaijan on August 2, 2001. On July 7, 2019, as part of the "Khan's Palace, Sheki's Historical Center", the Shaki Xan Mosque was included in the UNESCO World Heritage List.

== History ==
=== First periods ===
The mosque was built in 1183 AH (1769/1770 CE), by the order of Shaki Khan Muhammad Hussein Khan. After the completion of the mosque's construction, the poet Haji Muhammad Jalabi Efendi Zari, who lived during that period, composed a qasida consisting of nine verses. Within this qasida, hidden information indicates the construction date of the mosque. Additionally, literary scholar Salman Mumtaz states that the term "Riyaz-ul-Ulama," when calculated using the abjad system, corresponds to the construction date of the mosque in 1183 AH (1769/1770 CE). Both dates match the abjad calculation.

According to Salman Mumtaz's notes, the mosque was initially called the I Juma Mosque. In 1780 CE, during the battle with Haji Abdulqadir, Shaki Khan Muhammad Hussein Khan was wounded and forced to surrender. After spending a week as a captive, he was executed by drowning. His body was then buried inside the mihrab of the mosque that he had constructed. Following these events, the mosque came to be known as the Khan Mosque.

On April 14, 1853 CE (Note: according to many sources, the date might also be 1842–43.) the Shaki Khan Mosque burned down, along with the Nukha market. According to Mustafa Aga Shakikhanov, at that time, the market and the Jumu'ah Mosque, along with the surrounding houses, were also affected by the fire. After the fire, Mustafa Aga's father, Karim Aga Shakikhanov, started the restoration of the mosque, but unfortunately, he couldn't complete the task due to his passing.

=== During the Soviet occupation ===
After the Soviet occupation, an official campaign against religion began in 1928. In December of the same year, the Azerbaijan Communist Party Central Committee transferred many mosques, churches, and synagogues to the balance of educational clubs. If there were 3,000 mosques in Azerbaijan in 1917, by 1927, this number had decreased to 1,700, and by 1933, it was reduced to 17.

The Shaki Khan Mosque, after the occupation, was repurposed as a grain warehouse and used as the "House of intellectuals."

On March 6, 1968, by the decree of the Azerbaijan SSR Council of Ministers, the "Upper Bas State Historical and Architectural Reserve" was established in the historical Upper Bas neighborhood of Shaki. The Shaki Khan Mosque falls within the territory of this reserve.

Although a restoration project for the mosque was prepared in 1981, no work was carried out in the subsequent years.

=== After independence ===
The mosque, by the decision numbered 132 of the Cabinet of Azerbaijan on August 2, 2001, was included in the list of local significant immovable historical and cultural monuments.

Since 2001, the historical part of Shaki city has been nominated as a candidate for the UNESCO World Heritage List. On July 7, 2019, together with the Khan's Palace, it was included in the UNESCO World Heritage List as "Shaki's Historical Center." The decision was adopted at the 43rd session of the UNESCO World Heritage Committee held at the Baku Congress Center. The Shaki Khan Mosque, located in the historical center of Shaki, is also part of the World Heritage Site.

In 1992, the mosque was entrusted to the "New Azerbaijani Islamic Community" religious organization. Controversies arose around the mosque because the organization kept it permanently closed and did not allow other religious believers who were not members of their community to worship there. In addition, the organization avoided official state registration. In 2010, the Shaki court issued a resolution stating that the "Khan Mosque" should be vacated and transferred to the cultural department. After several years of legal disputes, the mosque was eventually reclaimed and placed under the balance of the State Tourism Agency of the Republic of Azerbaijan.

=== Recovery ===
Since May 2021, restoration work has been initiated at the Shaki Khan Mosque by the Heydar Aliyev Foundation. Before the restoration, research was conducted by the employees of the Institute of Archaeology and Ethnography of the Azerbaijan National Academy of Sciences (AMEA), led by Zaur Huseynov. On June 3, 2021, during excavations beneath the mihrab, large-scale stone slabs were discovered. Restoration work was halted, and after examinations conducted by the Shaki archaeological expedition, a grave was found in that part. The discovery of 52 beads and a decorative bead cap in the grave suggested the possibility that the buried person held high religious or state status. Salman Mumtaz's work, noting the burial of Shaki Khan Mehmed Hussein Khan under the mihrab of Mustaq Khan Mosque, along with other findings, prompted further investigations on the uncovered remains. Samples were taken from the discovered skeleton, and they were sent to the laboratory of the University of Oxford for radiocarbon and genetic analysis. Research and genetic analyses were conducted not only in the United Kingdom but also in Austria, Estonia, and Turkey, based on samples from the discovered skeleton and other graves related to the Khan lineage on the mosque's premises. According to the results of laboratory analyses and the scientific opinion of the Azerbaijan National Academy of Science Institute of Archaeology, Ethnography, and Anthropology, it was confirmed that the discovered grave belonged to Shaki Khan Mehmed Hussein Khan.

The restoration works on the mosque complex were carried out based on a project prepared by the University of Architecture and Construction at the request of the State Tourism Agency. To obtain the initial image of the mosque complex, 3D measurements were conducted on the premises. During the restoration, deteriorated bricks affected by climate conditions were replaced with new ones, and the flooring was renewed using fired bricks. Special materials were applied for insulation to protect the bricks on the minaret from erosion. The windows and the door used by Muhammad Hussein Khan during the initial construction of the mosque were restored based on the architects' recommendations. Two windows' original appearance was restored based on the architects' opinion and the use of the network.

Since there were no photos of the mosque's ceiling, a new ceiling was constructed in the network structure of the Godek minaret mosque and Shaki Khan Palace based on the joint decision of the State Tourism Agency and the project team. The internal and external walls of the building were restored by referring to photos from 1961.

In the mosque courtyard, a new pool has been constructed in place of the old one, and facilities such as a charitable house, ablution area, and administrative rooms have been built. A conservation zone has been established around the Khan plane trees and other trees in the yard. The ancient entrance gate and pillars of the mosque, as well as the tombstones in the Khan cemetery located to the south, have been restored.

Next to the mosque, several buildings in the surrounding area have been renovated, and a museum has been created. The museum showcases various artifacts related to the period of the Sheki Khanate, presenting material and cultural examples collected from different sources. On the museum's first floor, there are exhibits such as clay vessels from the Sheki Khanate period, national costumes, jewelry items, wall panels decorating the homes of 18th-century Sheki merchants, traditional candleholders placed in front of them according to customs, and examples of embroidery art. The second floor features Sheki carpets, various carpet-making tools, Abdullatif Efendi's book "The History of the Sheki Khans," written literature from the Sheki Khanate period, a network sample, coins used in the 18th century, and examples of weapons from the 18th to 19th centuries.

On the second floor, there is the Khan's chamber. In this section, there are exhibits such as the oud musical instrument used in literary gatherings organized by Sheki Khan Mehdi Huseyn Khan Mushtag, Mehdi Huseyn Khan's chessboard, a replica of Mehdi Huseyn Khan's throne based on depictions in historical sources from 2014-2015, the attire of the Sheki Khan based on miniature depictions in the Sheki Khan's Palace, and the battle flag used in the 18th century by Sheki Khanate and Sheki Khan Salim Khan.

On December 2, 2022, the opening ceremony of the Sheki Khan Mosque complex took place after the restoration. On the same day, the mosque was also opened for religious services.

== Architecture ==
The mosque is 45 m (148 ft) long and 10 m (33 ft) wide. Its 21 m (69 ft)-high minaret is constructed using fired bricks and decorative tiles. Local construction materials such as river stone, fired bricks, decorative tiles, roof tiles, plane trees, pistachios, and walnut trees were used in its construction. The mosque features an external arched gallery and a minaret. Adjacent to the mosque is the Khan's cemetery, where Sheki khans, their family members, and close associates were buried.

== Pictures ==
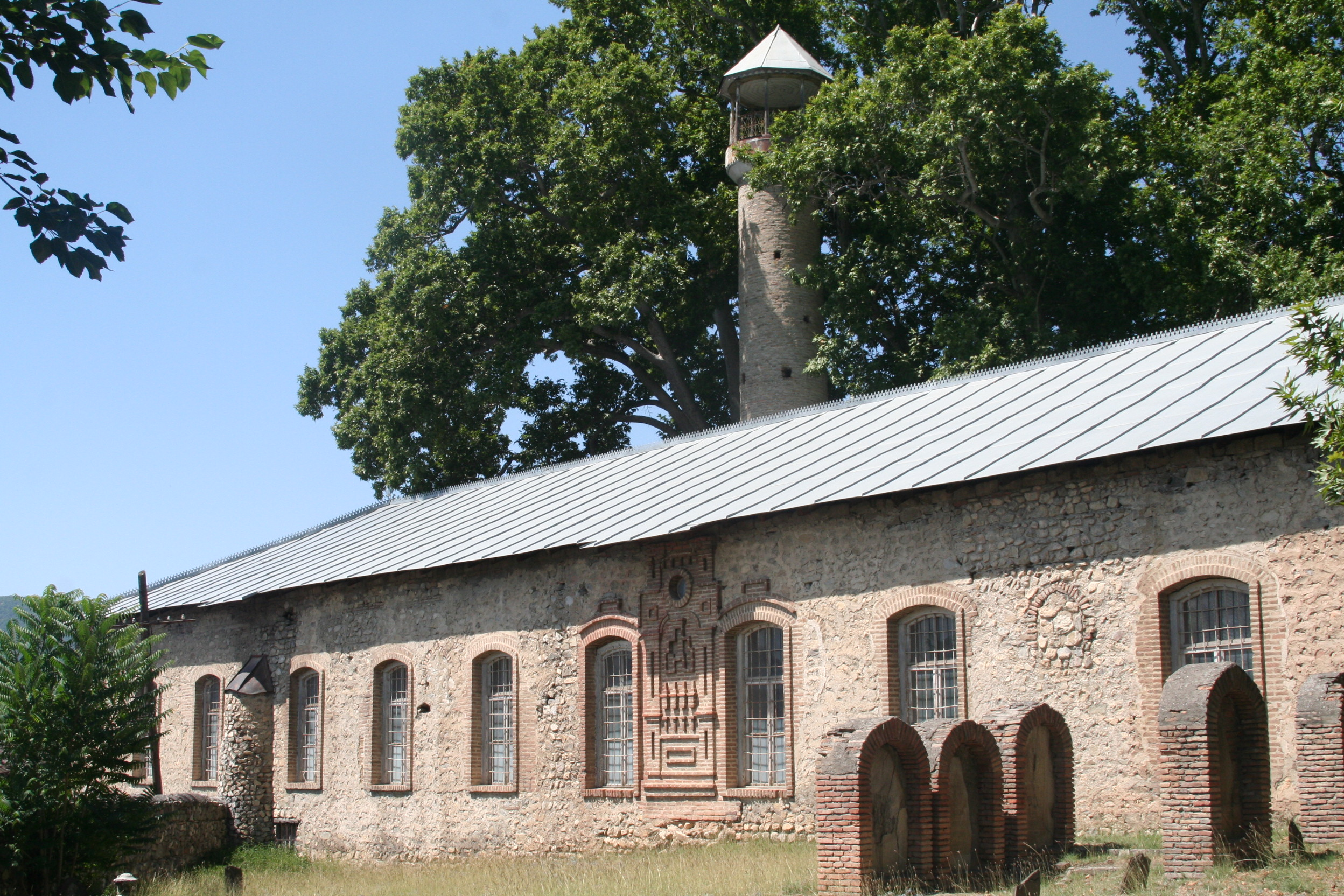

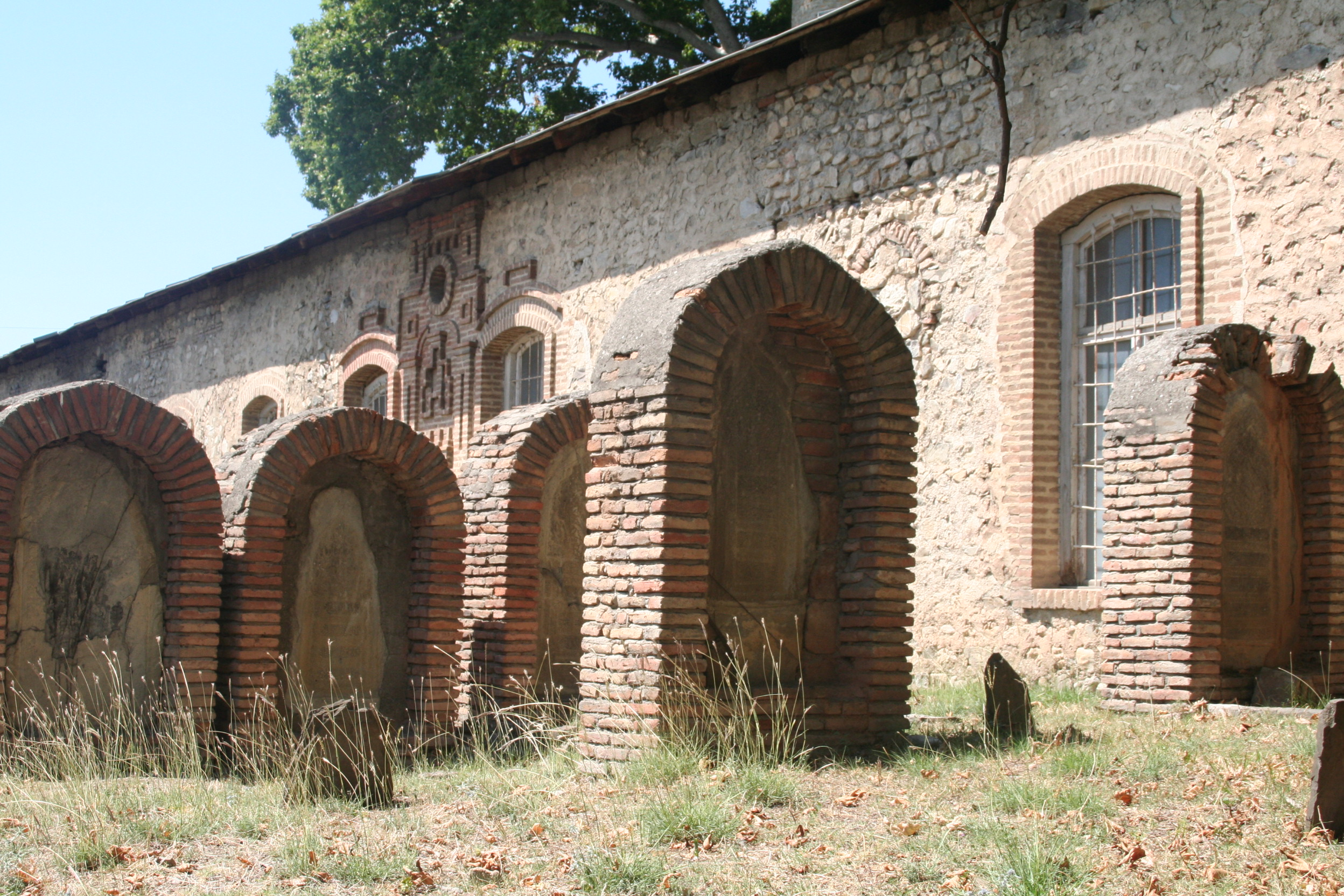

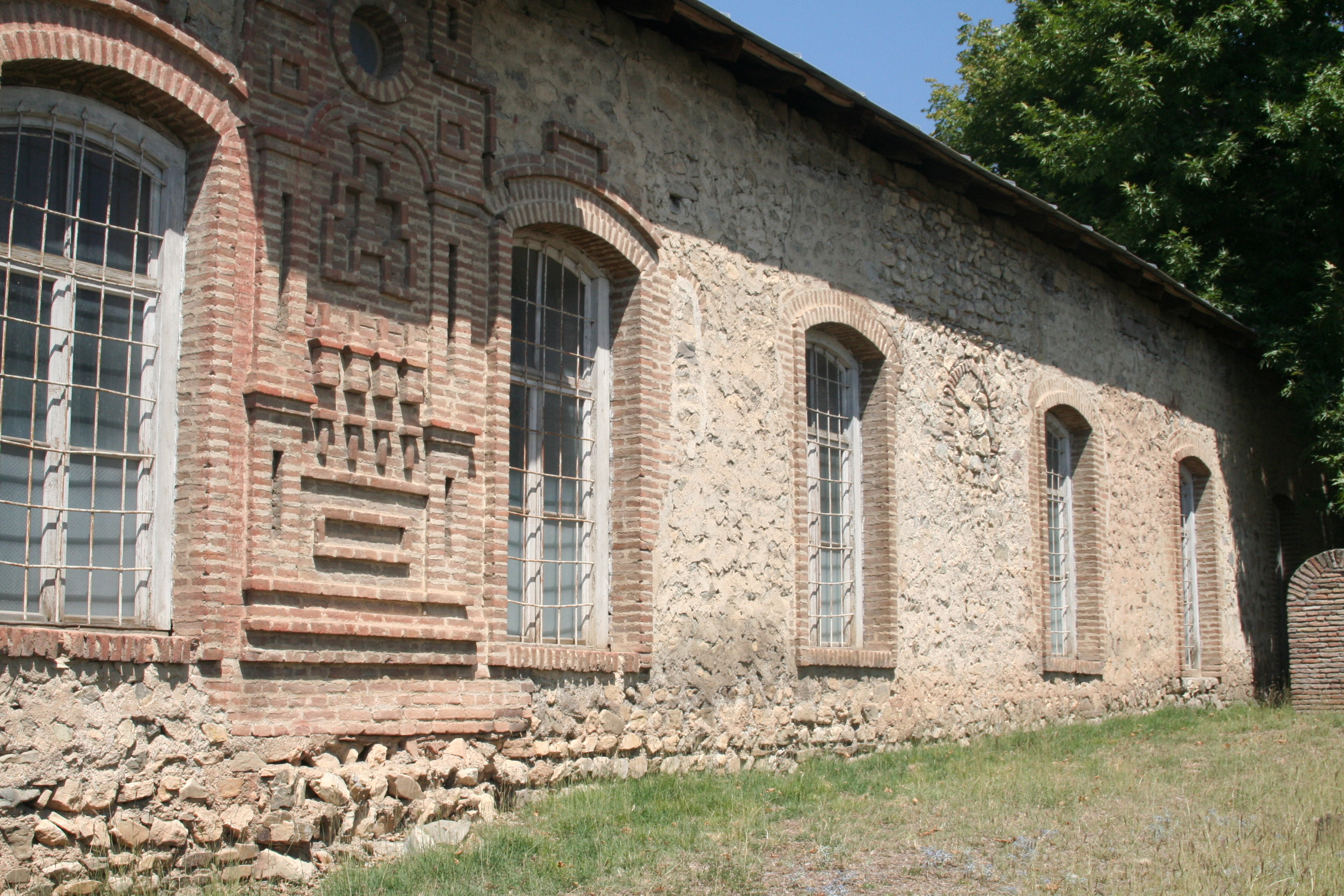

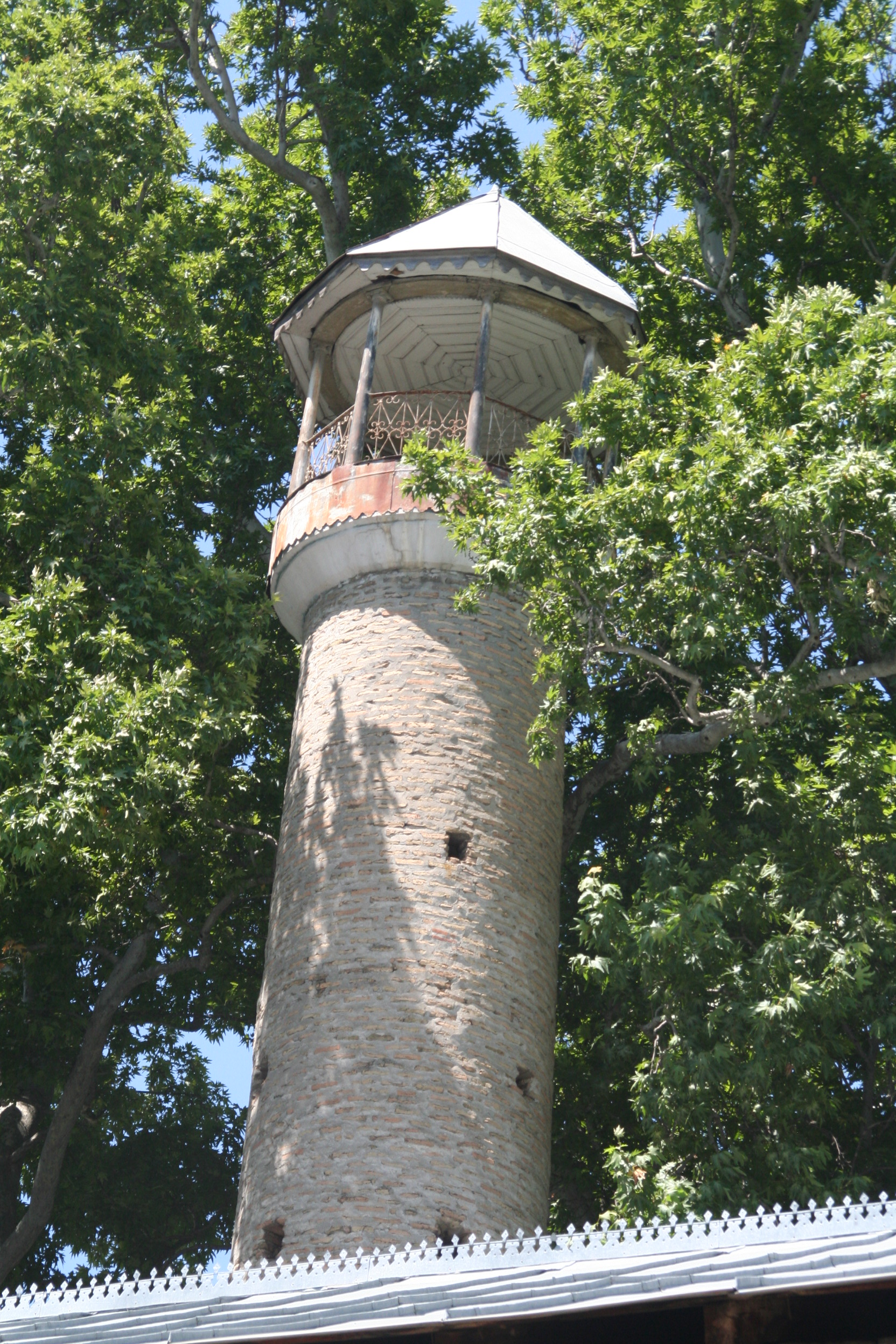

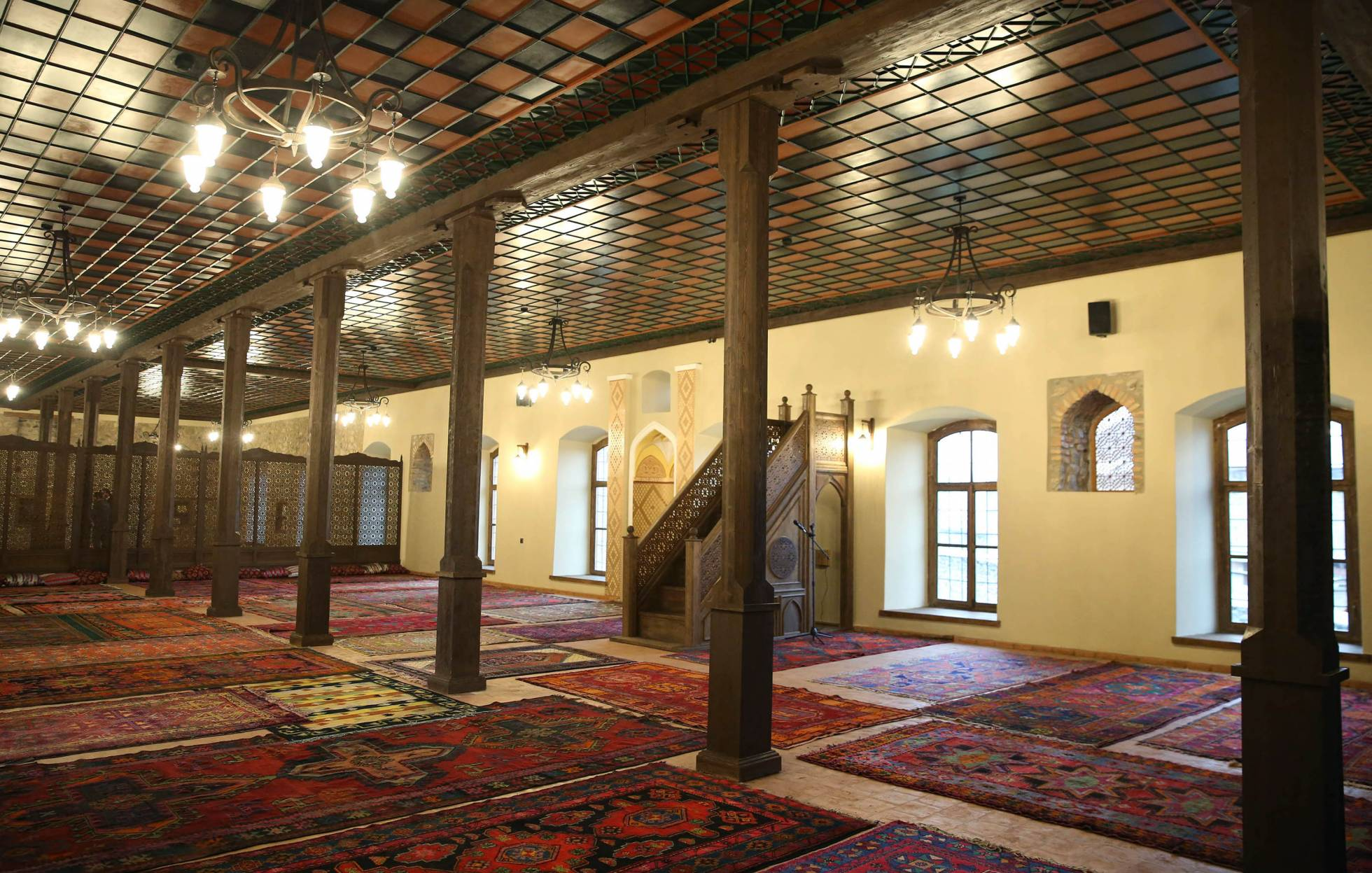

== See also ==
- Islam in Azerbaijan
- List of mosques in Azerbaijan
- Epigraphic monuments in the cemetery of Shaki Khan
