= Palace of Shaki Khans =

Palace in Azerbaijan

- Şəki xan sarayı (Azerbaijani) کاخ خانان شکی (Persian)
Map location and basic information
Interactive map of the Palace of Shaki Khans area
Alternative names	Shaki Khan Palace
General information
Location	Shaki, Azerbaijan
Coordinates	41°12′16″N 47°11′51.2″E
Construction started	1789/1790
Completed	1797
Height
Height	10 metres (33 ft)
Design and construction
Architect	Abbasgulu (presumably)

UNESCO World Heritage Site
- Official name: Historic Centre of Sheki with the Khan’s Palace
- Criteria: Cultural: (ii), (v)
- Reference: 1549
- Inscription: 2019 (43rd Session)
- Area: 120.5 ha (298 acres)
- Buffer zone: 146 ha (360 acres)

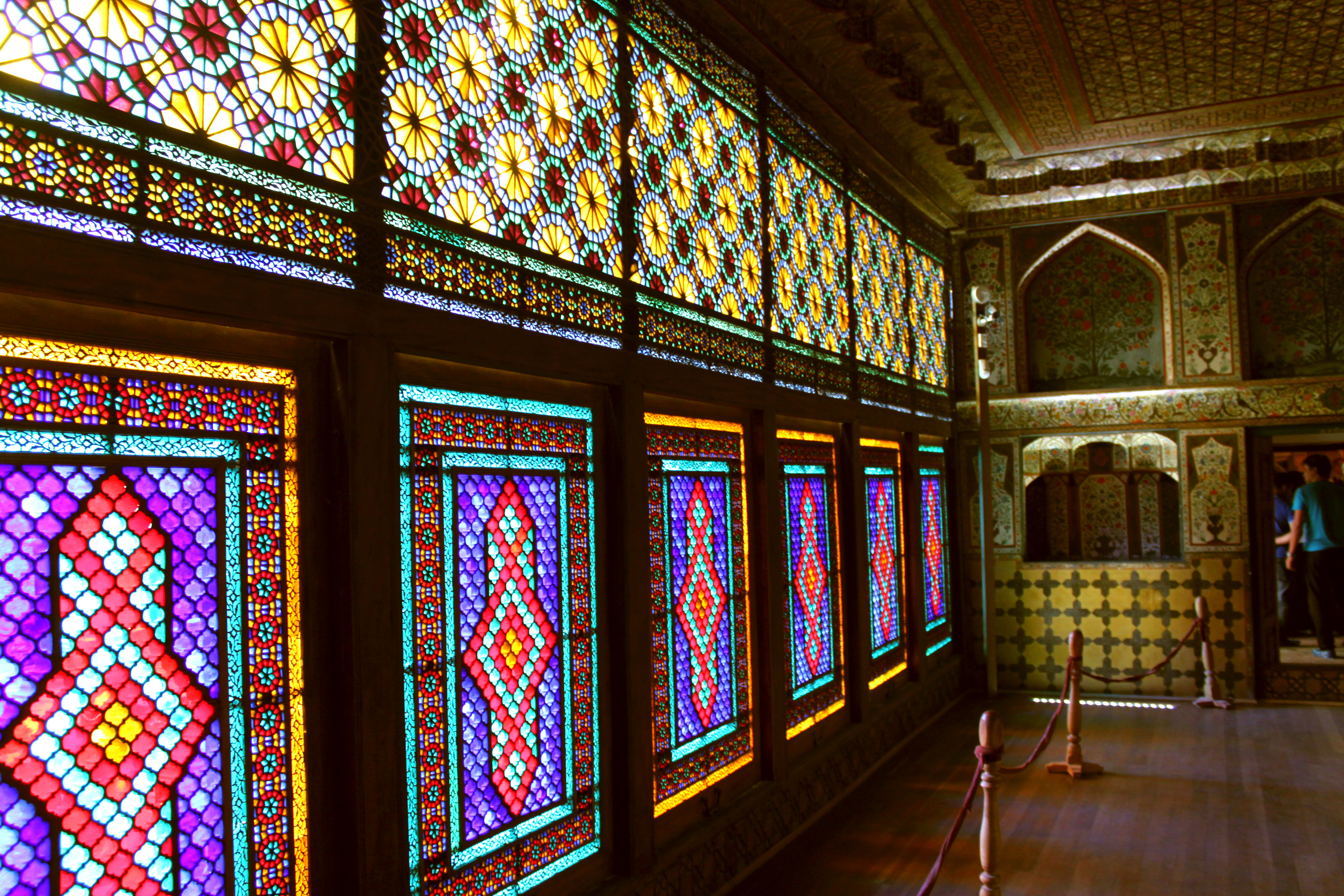
Interior of the Consultation Room

The Palace of Shaki Khans (Azerbaijani: Şəki xan sarayı or Şəki xanlarının sarayı; Persian: کاخ خانان شکی) in Shaki, northwestern Azerbaijan, is a historic monument that once served as the summer residence of the Shaki khans. It was constructed in 1797 under the rule of Muhammad Husayn Khan Mushtaq.

The Palace of Shaki Khans was nominated for inclusion on the UNESCO World Heritage List in 1998 by Gulnara Mehmandarova, then President of the Azerbaijan Committee of the International Council on Monuments and Sites (ICOMOS). On 7 July 2019, the historic centre of Shaki, including the Khan’s Palace, was inscribed as a UNESCO World Heritage Site.

== Preservation and restoration ==
From 1955 to 1965 restoration was carried out in full under the supervision of Niyazi Rzaev. Two talented architects, Kamal Mamedbekov and Nikolai Utsyn, were involved in this work creating measurement and restoration drawings. The restoration workshop was established in the ceremonial hall on the second floor of the palace, and the rooms flanking the hall were used to accommodate the architects. The drawings developed by Mamedbekov and Utsyn formed the basis of the restoration project for the entire palace complex. Execution of the restoration work based on the drawings was entrusted to the artist F. Hajiyev and the shabaka master A. Rasulov.

The last total and complete restoration from 2002 to 2004 supported by the World Bank and executed under leading of a German restoration team (Uwe Henschel, Dietrich Wellmer, Elisabeth Wellmer, Andreas Lessmeister) from company "Denkmalpflege Mecklenburg GmbH" (today "Neumühler Bauhütte GmbH"). The Khan’s Palace was thoroughly analyzed by Leonid Bretanitsky, who reviewed numerous historical documents and data. The palace has been renovated and restored several times since the 1830s and underwent several changes. The main renovation works were carried out between 1848 and 1851 under the supervision of architect Cambiaccio by the orders of Prince Vorontsov. Local Sheki masters – Usta Bagir Usta Ali oglu, Eyyub Haji Ibrahim oglu, Haji Huseyn Karbalayi Yusif oglu were involved in these works. The renovation was carried out mostly on the main façade and the ground floor. Thus, according to the written report, both the plaster and ornaments of the main façade were renewed. The interior of the main hall of the ground floor was also replastered, and wall paintings were renewed. However, the wall paintings in the side rooms were not restored after the walls were plastered. Doors, ceilings, mantelpieces were all repaired. The groundwas not altered and remained as made of three-layered rammed earth. The roof was dismantled and rebuilt using painted wood shingles from oak instead of ceramic tiles. The fountain in the central hall of the ground floor was dismantled and not restored. The report did not mention any of the other buildings included in the palace complex. These buildings were demolished by 1851. Only a two-story palace building survived until the present time built in Shaki fortress and consisting of several buildings. Although the building has repeatedly been repaired and reconstructed since it was built, all this work didn't have a serious impact on its appearance. After the Shaki Khanate joined the Russian Empire, the palace was subordinated to the local administration and repaired repeatedly. Restoration was carried out in the palace by Hussein Khan Mushtag's grandson, poet Karim agha Fateh during 1848–1851.

“Restoration of khans palace” was discussed in Avercom plenum on April 25, 1991, and following decision was made: “Restoration of khans palace is under the responsibility of Narkomprosom according to the previous decision of Azverkom. 25 million rubles have been allocated from the budget of Narkomprosom for the repair of khan's palaces in Shusha and Shaki.” Restoration report was submitted based on the restoration project review by architect Pyotr Baranovsky in a meeting of the Commonwealth Academy of Architecture held on 13 March 1939.

Restoration work started in the palace within the framework of the project on "Cultural heritage protection" in 2002.

Along with its pool and plane trees, the summer residence is the only remaining structure from the larger palatial complex inside the Shaki Khans' Fortress, which once included a winter palace, residences for the Khan's family and servants' quarters. It features decorative tiles, fountains and several stained-glass windows. The exterior was decorated with dark blue, turquoise and ochre tiles in geometric patterns and the murals were coloured with tempera and were inspired by the works of Nizami Ganjavi.

Measuring thirty-two meters by eight and a half meters on the exterior, the summer residence is a two-story masonry structure elongated on the north–south axis and covered with a wooden hipped roof with long eaves. The layout of both floors is identical; three rectangular rooms are placed in a row, separated by narrow, south-facing iwans that provide access to the rooms. The floors are accessed separately to accommodate their public and private functions. Entered from the south through the two iwans, the ground floor was used primarily by clerks and petitioners. Two stairways attached to the northern façade gave access to the first floor, which was reserved for the khan's family and their guests.

The summer residence is renowned for the lavish decoration of its exterior and interior. Large portions of the residence's facade, including the entire southern elevations of the central halls on both floors, are covered by a mosaic of colored glass set in a wooden latticework (shebeke) that was assembled without nails or glue. Muqarnas hoods crowning the four iwans are highlighted with gold on the lower level and covered with mirror fragments on the first floor. Remaining surfaces on all façades are decorated with floral tile panels and tile mosaics.

The interior walls of the residence are covered entirely with frescoes painted at different times during the eighteenth century. Many of the frescoes feature flowers in vases, while a series of paintings on the first floor halls depict hunting and battle scenes. Signatures on frescoes list the names of artists Ali Kuli, Kurban Kuli and Mirza Jafar from Shemaha, Usta Gambar from Shusha, and Abbas Kuli, who may also have been the architect of the summer residence.

== History ==
In 1946 Konstantinov wrote in his article "Nuha": "This Magnificent Palace—the top of luxury and taste of Persian architects, was built in 1790 by Shiraz resident Haji Zeynal Abdin".

Poet Nikolai Tikhonov, who visited the palace in 1947, described the palace in his autobiographical story "the Roads-the trails".

"The paintings of the Khan's Palace and various patterns are well preserved, and they assure us that art was developed in ancient Nukha, and poetry and philosophy was highly appreciated."

In 1968, the historical part of Yukhari-Bash, located at Palace of Shaki Khans, was declared a historical-architectural reserve. The Palace of Shaki Khans was nominated for List of World Heritage Sites, UNESCO in 2001 by Gulnara Mehmandarova—president of Azerbaijan Committee of ICOMOS—International Council on Monuments and Sites. Director-General of UNESCO, Irina Bokova visited the Palace of Shaki Khans within the framework of official visit to Sheki on 1 August 2010.

On 4 July 2012, the 250th anniversary of the palace was celebrated in Shaki. Ambassadors of nearly 30 countries and international organizations, including figures of science, culture and art of the country, as well as members of the National Assembly took part in the ceremony.

== Legal framework ==
The historical center of Sheki, including the Khan’s Palace, was inscribed on the UNESCO World Heritage List in 2019 under criteria (ii) and (v). This inscription recognizes Sheki as an outstanding example of a traditional human settlement and a site of cultural exchange along the Silk Roads. As a result, the site is now subject to international heritage protection standards and requires careful planning for any conservation or development actions.

== Research ==
For the first time, the Shaki Khan Palace was studied by the Department of Azerbaijan Monument Protection. Later, the Institute of History named after Bakikhanov of SSR Academy of Sciences has thoroughly investigated the monument in more detail. In the following period, the Department of Architectural Works under the Council of Ministers of the Azerbaijan SSR was involved in the study of monuments in Azerbaijan.

Early research work in the palace was carried out with the participation of Professor Fridolin and Sharifov. In 1936, a special expert staff including Denike, Chepeleva, Weimar, and Bolotova from the Moscow State Museum of Eastern Cultures collected a lot of information about the monument.
