= Shaki Khanate =

Khanate under Iranian and Russian control

- 1743–1819
- Banner of Selim Khan, captured by Russian forces on 22 October, 1806 during the Russo-Persian War (1804-1813)

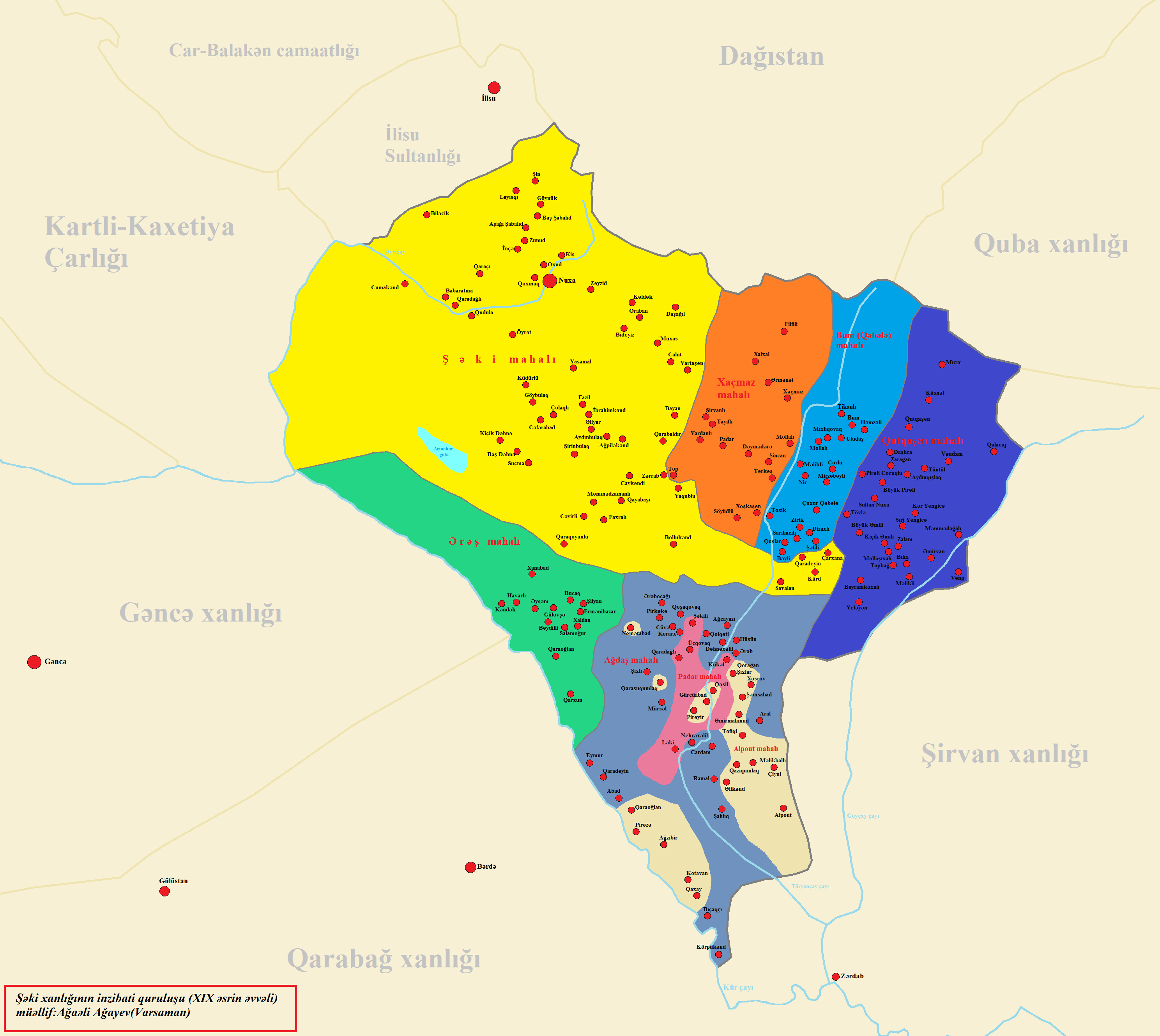
- Status: Khanate; Under Iranian suzerainty (1743–1813); Under Russian suzerainty (1813–1822)
- Capital: Shaki (1743–1772); Nukha (1772–1819)
- Common languages: Persian (administration, judiciary, and literature); Arabic (islamic studies); Azerbaijani (locally); Lezgian (locally); Armenian (locally)
- Khan
  - 1743–1755: Haji Chalabi Khan (first)
  - 1814–1819: Ismail Khan Donboli (last)
- History
  - Established: 1743
  - Iran officially cedes Shaki to the Russian Empire: 1813
  - Abolished by the Russian Empire: 1819
Preceded by	Succeeded by
Afsharid Iran	Russian Empire

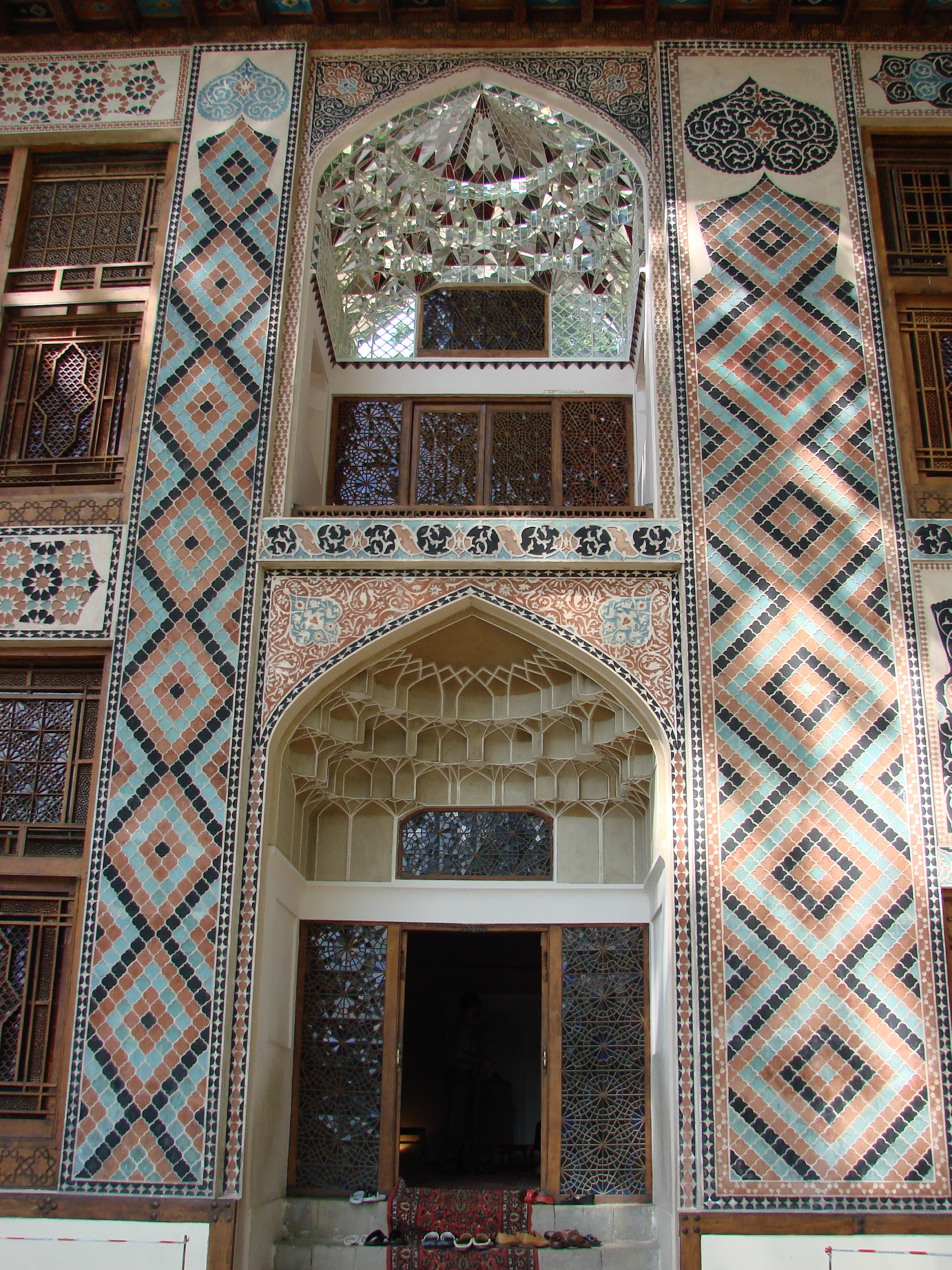
Entrance to the Palace of Shaki khans

The Shaki Khanate (also spelled Shakki; Persian: خانات شکی, romanized: Khānāt-e Shakkī) was a khanate under Iranian and later Russian suzerainty, which controlled the town of Shaki and its surroundings, now located in present-day Azerbaijan.

== History ==
Since 1551, Shaki had been under the control of Safavid Iran (1501–1736), being part of its Shirvan province. It was governed by different tribal leaders, who were given the title of toyuldar (fief-holder). Following Nader's expulsion of the Ottoman Empire from the South Caucasus, Ali-Mardan and later Najaf Qoli were given the responsibility of governing Shaki. However, in 1743 a rebellion emerged under the leadership of the local leader and former tax-collector Haji Chalabi Khan as a response to the ineffective management by Nader's deputies. Najaf Qoli was murdered by the rebels, who chose Haji Chalabi Khan to be their khan. Nader Shah subsequently appointed the local leader Ja'far as the new khan, despite failing to expelling Haji Chalabi Khan from his fortress. A khanate was a type of administrative unit governed by a hereditary or appointed ruler subject to Iranian rule. The title of the ruler was either beglarbegi or khan, which was identical to the Ottoman rank of pasha. The khanates were still seen as Iranian dependencies even when the shahs in mainland Iran lacked the power to enforce their rule in the area. A zealous Muslim, Haji Chalabi was a grandson of the priest of the former church of Kish.

Following Nader Shah's assassination in 1747, Iran fell into turmoil, especially in the South Caucasus. There the Georgians and local khans fought over land. Haji Chalabi Khan subsequently made an alliance with the Lezgians. When he repelled an attack south of the Aras river by one of the pretenders to the Iranian throne, his status as khan of Shaki became unquestioned. The Georgian monarchs Heraclius II (r. 1744–1798) and Teimuraz II (r. 1732–1762), who wanted to expand their own control over a significant portion of the South Caucasus, started to feel threatened by Haji Chalabi Khan's power.

In their upcoming battle against Haji Chalabi Khan, Heraclius II and Teimuraz II made an alliance with the following khans; Ahmad Khan Donboli of Khoy, Panah Ali Khan of Karabakh, Kazem Khan of Qaradagh, and Shahverdi Khan of Ganja. However, before the battle started, Heraclius II and Teimuraz II had all the khans imprisoned, demanding them to submit to their rule and pay tribute. Near Shamkhor, Haji Chalabi Khan encountered the Georgian kings, defeated them, and freed the khans who were being held captive. A second Georgian offensive against Haji Chalabi Khan near the Alazani river also failed.

In 1755, Haji Chalabi Khan died and was succeeded by his son Agha Kishi Beg. In addition to fortifying the town of Shaki, he carried on his father's policy of maintaining cordial ties with the nearby khanates of Shirvan and Quba. Agha Kishi Beg married the daughter of the Qazi-Qomuq chief in Daghestan, Mohammad Khan. In 1759, Agha Kishi Beg was persuaded to a meeting where he was killed by Mohammad Khan and the latters ally Soltan Ali, a well-known local figure. A grandson of Haji Chalabi Khan, Muhammad Husayn Khan Mushtaq, was sent away to safety in Shirvan by the dignitaries of the Shaki khanate. He came back some months later, expelled the Qazi-Qomuq, and reinstated his family's rule in Shaki. He had a new palace constructed and created several mahals (districts) (Note: According to the Iranian-American historian George Bournoutian: "The term mahal can be translated as "district," "area," or "zone." Occasionally it can be translated as "quarter," although mahalle is the more appropriate term for quarter. "District" is the most accepted translation for mahal.") inside his realm, each of which was under the control of a different governor.

By 1762, the Zand ruler Karim Khan Zand (r. 1751–1779) had established his authority across most of Iran, and was eventually acknowledged by Georgia and the various khans of the South Caucasus as their suzerain. In 1772, Muhammad Husayn Khan Mushtaq was compelled to relocate his capital to the nearby village of Nukha.

Even though Haji Chalabi Khan's descendants were to retain rule over the Shaki Khanate according to the 1805 agreement, Ivan Gudovich soon disregarded that term as he did not have faith in a family that had a history of regularly switching allegiances and betraying each other. Gudovich therefore gave control of the Shaki Khanate to Jafar Qoli Khan Donboli, a chieftain from the Kurdish Donboli tribe who opposed the Qajar dynasty and had proved his loyalty to the Russians during their siege of Erivan in 1804. On January 12, 1807, Jafar Qoli Khan and Gudovich signed a new treaty as the previous one had been signed with a family that was no longer in power. Jafar Qoli Khan and his followers from Khoy were despised by the dignitaries of Shaki. They requested that the Russians reinstall Salim Khan or his blind brother, Mohammad Hasan Khan. Gudovich declined, calling Salim Khan a traitor and the cause of the deaths of numerous Russian soldiers during his uprising. Jafar Qoli Khan died in 1814 and was succeeded by his son Ismail Khan Donboli.

Ismail Khan Donboli was an unpopular khan, and after his death in 1819, the Russian Empire abolished the Shaki Khanate. This led to all the sons of the khan to flee to Iran. Suleiman Khan, one of the sons, returned to Russia in the late 1820s, and enlisted in the Russian army. He was among those dispatched to Warsaw, and the tsar also met him in 1841. However, he returned to Iran in the early 1840s and was even given a gift by the shah. Russian authorities intended to fire Suleiman Khan because they were angered by what they saw as betrayal. Suleiman Khan ultimately turned himself in to the Russian embassy in Tabriz, claiming that his family in Iran had forced him to stay there.

== Administration ==
The administrative and literary language in the Shaki Khanate until the end of the 19th century was Persian, with Arabic being used only for religious studies. Persian was also spoken in the judiciary. The khanate produced its own coins, first in the name of Nader Shah and then in the name of Karim Khan. A large portion of their coinage was completely nameless by the end of the 18th century. While a few uncommon issues of Derbent contain a vague reference to one of their khans, none of the khans ever put their names on their coins, due to lacking the legitimacy of a sovereign monarch and any claims to independence. These northern Iranian coins were made entirely of silver and copper.

== Demographics ==
Ethnic map of the Shaki Khanate in 1819.

The population mainly consisted of Turkic-speaking groups, and a minority of Lezgians, Armenians, and Mountain Jews.

== List of khans ==
- 1743–1755: Haji Chalabi Khan
- 1755–1759: Agha Kishi Beg
- 1759–1780: Muhammad Husayn Khan
- 1780–1783: Haji Abdulqadir Khan
- 1783–1795: Muhammad Hasan Khan (first time)
- 1795–1797: Salim Khan (first time)
- 1797–1802: Muhammad Hasan Khan (second time)
- 1805: Fath-Ali Khan (first time)
- 1802–1805: Salim Khan (second time)
- 1806: Fath-Ali Khan (second time)
- 1806–1814: Jafar Qoli Khan Donboli
- 1814–1819: Ismail Khan Donboli

== Sources ==
- Akopyan, Alexander; Petrov, Pavel (2016). "The Coinage of Īrawān, Nakhjawān, Ganja and Qarabāḡ Khānates in 1747–1827". State Hermitage: 1–9.
- Behrooz, Maziar (2023). Iran at War: Interactions with the Modern World and the Struggle with Imperial Russia. I.B. Tauris. ISBN 978-0755637379.
- Bosworth, C. Edmund (2000). "Ganja". In Yarshater, Ehsan (ed.). Encyclopædia Iranica. Vol. X/3: Fruit–Gāvbāzī. London and New York: Routledge & Kegan Paul. pp. 282–283. ISBN 978-0-933273-47-4.
- Bournoutian, George (1976). The Khanate of Erevan Under Qajar Rule: 1795–1828. University of California. ISBN 978-0-939214-18-1.
- Bournoutian, George (1994). A History of Qarabagh: An Annotated Translation of Mirza Jamal Javanshir Qarabaghi's Tarikh-e Qarabagh. Mazda Publishers. ISBN 978-1-56859-011-0.
- Bournoutian, George (2016a). The 1820 Russian Survey of the Khanate of Shirvan: A Primary Source on the Demography and Economy of an Iranian Province prior to its Annexation by Russia. Gibb Memorial Trust. ISBN 978-1-909724-80-8.
- Bournoutian, George (2016b). "Prelude to War: The Russian Siege and Storming of the Fortress of Ganjeh, 1803–4". Iranian Studies. 50 (1). Taylor & Francis: 107–124. doi:10.1080/00210862.2016.1159779. S2CID 163302882.
- Bournoutian, George (2021). From the Kur to the Aras: A Military History of Russia's Move into the South Caucasus and the First Russo-Iranian War, 1801–1813. Brill. ISBN 978-90-04-44515-4.
- Dawud, Ali Al-e; Oberling, Pierre (1995). "Donbolī". In Yarshater, Ehsan (ed.). Encyclopædia Iranica. Vol. VII/5: Divorce IV–Drugs. London and New York: Routledge & Kegan Paul. pp. 492–495. ISBN 978-1-56859-023-3.
- Deutschmann, Moritz (2015). Iran and Russian Imperialism: The Ideal Anarchists, 1800-1914. Routledge. ISBN 978-1317385301. OCLC 945764907.
- Hambly, Gavin R. G. (1991). "Iran during the reigns of Fath 'Alī Shāh and Muhammad Shāh". In Avery, Peter; Hambly, Gavin R. G.; Melville, Charles Peter (eds.). The Cambridge History of Iran: From Nadir Shah to the Islamic Republic. Vol. 7. Cambridge: Cambridge University Press. pp. 144–173. ISBN 0-521-20095-4.
- Matthee, Rudi; Floor, Willem; Clawson, Patrick (2013). The Monetary History of Iran: From the Safavids to the Qajars. I.B.Tauris. ISBN 978-0-85772-172-3.
- Minorsky, Vladimir & Bosworth, Clifford Edmund (1997). "S̲h̲akkī". In Bosworth, C. E.; van Donzel, E.; Heinrichs, W. P. & Lecomte, G. (eds.). The Encyclopaedia of Islam, Second Edition. Volume IX: San–Sze. Leiden: E. J. Brill. ISBN 978-90-04-10422-8.
- Swietochowski, Tadeusz (2004). Russian Azerbaijan, 1905–1920: The Shaping of a National Identity in a Muslim Community. Cambridge University Press. ISBN 978-0-521-52245-8.
- Tsutsiev, Arthur (2014). Atlas of the Ethno-Political History of the Caucasus. Yale University Press. ISBN 978-0300153088.
