= Shaki, Azerbaijan =

Shaki Şəki
- City
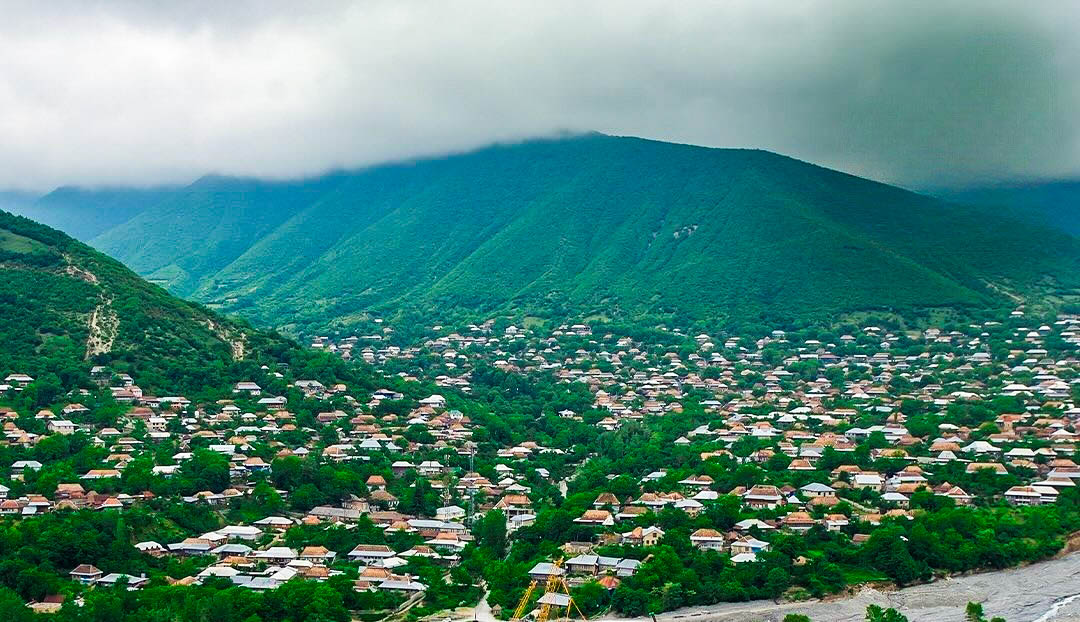

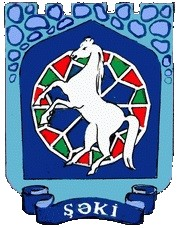
- Seal

- Coordinates: 41°11′31″N 47°10′14″E
- Country: Azerbaijan
- Region: Shaki-Zagatala

Government
  - Governor: Elkhan Usubov
- Elevation: 700 m (2,300 ft)

Population (2020)
  - Total: 68,400
- Time zone: UTC+4 (AZT)
- Postcode: 5500
- Website: sheki-ih.gov.az

Historic Centre of Sheki with the Khan's Palace
UNESCO World Heritage Site
- Interactive map of Historic Centre of Sheki with the Khan's Palace
- Criteria: Cultural: ii, v
- Reference: 1549rev
- Inscription: 2019 (43rd Session)
- Area: 120.5 ha (298 acres)
- Buffer zone: 146 ha (360 acres)

Shaki (Azerbaijani: Şəki, Azerbaijani pronunciation: [ʃæ'ki]) is a city in northwestern Azerbaijan, surrounded by the district of the same name. It is located in the southern part of the Greater Caucasus mountain range, 240 km (150 mi) from Baku. As of 2020, it has a population of 68,400. The center of the city and the Palace of Shaki Khans were inscribed in the UNESCO World Heritage List in 2019 because of their unique architecture and history as an important trading center along the Silk Road.

== Etymology ==
According to the Azerbaijani historians, the name of the town goes back to the ethnonym of the Sakas, who reached the territory of modern-day Azerbaijan in the 7th century B.C. and populated it for several centuries. In the medieval sources, the name of the town is found in various forms such as Sheke, Sheki, Shaka, Shakki, Shakne, Shaken, Shakkan, Shekin.

The city was known as Nukha (Azerbaijani: Nuxa; Russian: Нуха) until 1968.

== History ==
=== Antiquity ===
There are traces of large-scale settlements in Shaki dating back to more than 2700 years ago. The Sakas were an Iranian people that wandered from the north side of the Black Sea through Derbend passage and to the South Caucasus and from there to Asia Minor in the 7th century B.C. They occupied a good deal of the fertile lands in South Caucasus in an area called Sakasena. The city of Shaki was one of the areas occupied by the Sakas. The original settlement dates back to the late Bronze Age.

Shaki was founded in the 8th century B.C. Shaki was one of the biggest cities of the Caucasian Albanian states in the 1st century. The kingdom of Shaki was divided into 11 administrative provinces. The main temple of the ancient Albanians was located there. The Albanians adopted Christianity early from the Armenians, and Armenian cultural and religious influence became strong in Shaki.

As a result of archaeological excavations conducted in 1902 in the village of Boyuk-Dakhna in the Shaki region, various ceramic products and a stone tombstone dating back to the 2nd century AD and containing inscriptions in Greek were discovered.

Shaki was one of the important political and economic cities before the Arab invasion. But as a result of the invasion in 654, Shaki was annexed to the third emirate of Arminiya. At the turn of the 9th century, when the Arab caliphate was weak, Shaki joined with Cambysene and was ruled by the Armenian Smbatean princes as part of the independent principality of Shaki or Hereti, a vassal of the Armenian Bagratid kingdom. The population was mostly of Armenian origin and Armenian-speaking. The first Armenian prince of Shaki was Sahl Smbatean, who ruled with relative autonomy from the Abbasid Caliphate. By the 10th century, the Arab geographer, Ibn Haukal mentions that Shaki was ruled by the Armenian prince Prince Ishkhanik. From 1038 to 1105, the Armenian Kiurikian dynasty ruled Shaki as part of the Kingdom of Kakheti-Hereti. In 1117, the region was captured by the army of the Georgian king David IV.

The city was also ruled by the Atabegs of Azerbaijan and the Khwarazmian Empire, before the Mongol invasion.

=== Feudal era ===
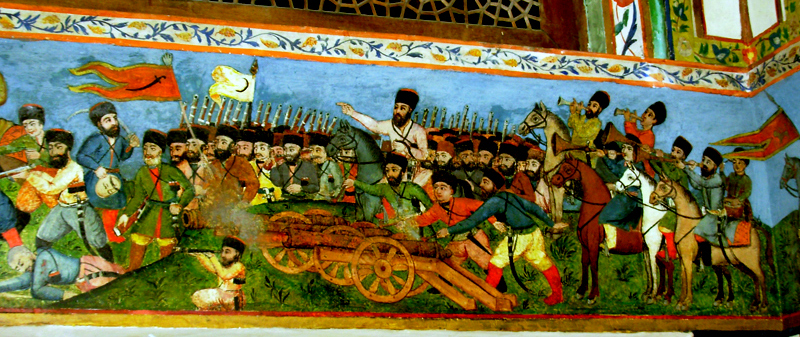
Battle scene miniature on the wall of Khan's Palace of Shaki

In the 13th and 14th centuries, the territory of the present Shaki district was a part of the state of Shirvanshahs. Management of Shaki was entrusted to the son of Rashid al-Din Hamadani – Jalat In the 30s of the 14th century, the local Oirat tribe took power. After the collapse of the Hulagu Khan's rule in the first half of the 14th century, the Principality of Shaki emerged as an independent state under the rule of Sidi Ahmed Orlat. In 1392, Emir Timur captured Shaki, and the ruler of Shaki, Seyid Ali, was killed. Seyid Ali's son, Seyid Ahmed, who came to power, along with Shirvanshah Ibrahim I Derbendi, accompanied Timur on his third campaign against Azerbaijan in 1399. In 1444, Shaki, then known as Nukhi, was ruled by a Muslim family of Armenian origin whose reign lasted till 1551. In the early 1500s, Safavid king Ismail I (r. 1501–1524) conquered the area, but the town continued to be governed by its hereditary rulers, under Safavid suzerainty.

Ismail's son and successor Shah Tahmasp (r. 1524–1576) put an end to this, and in 1551, he appointed the first Qizilbash governor to rule the town. The territory was annexed to the Safavid dynasty as the independent Sheki beylerbey reigned by Toygun-bey Qajar.

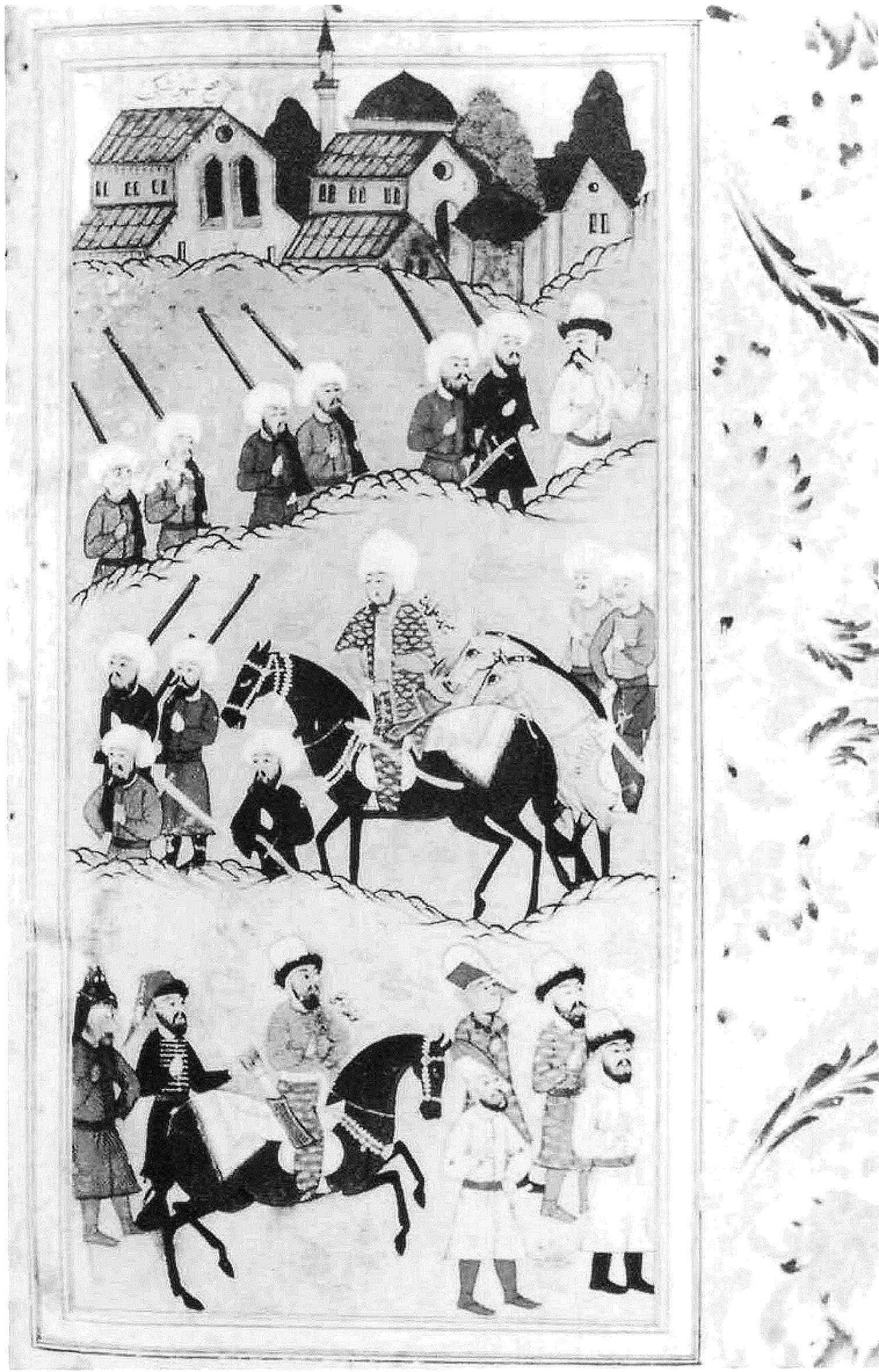
Ottoman troops under Lala Mustafa Pasha, and Alexander II of Kakheti with his Georgian troops (bottom) at the conquest of Sheki in Shirvan from the Safavids on 10 September 1578. Nusretname, Topkapi, H.1365.

Safavid rule was twice briefly interrupted by the Ottomans between 1578 and 1603 and 1724–1735. In 1734-1735, there was a revolt of poor people against the policy of Nadir Shah in the village of Bilecik (Shaki)

In 1741, there was another uprising against the local ruler, Melik Najaf. Appointed by Nadir Shah, Haji Chelebi, who claimed descent from the hereditary Muslim-Armenian rulers of the province, announced the formation of an independent Sheki khanate in 1743. Upon learning of this, Nadir Shah Afshar sent his army to Shaki. Haji Chelebi took refuge in the fortress of Gelesen-Geresen. In 1746, Haji Celebi was forced to recognize the authority of Nadir Shah. However, new uprisings and the death of Nadir Shah allowed Haji Chelebi to re-declare himself Khan During the existence of Shaki khanate, the local population of the city was engaged in silkworm breeding, craft and trade. As a result of a flood in the river Kish, the city of Shaki was partially ruined and the population was resettled in the present day city.

In alliance with the Shamakhi Khan, in 1748 Haji Chelebi attempted to besiege the Bayat fortress. The defeat in the battle of Bayat, which lasted for a month, had been a serious setback for allies.

The Jaro-Balakan Jamaat, Qabala and Ares sultanates were dependent on the Shaki khanate

In 1751, Haji Chelebi defeated the army of the Kakheti king Heraclius II. At the initiative of Heraclius II, a political conspiracy of the Kakheti Kingdom, the Karabakh, Ganja, Irevan, Nakhichevan, and Karadag khanates against the Shaki khan was arranged. In 1752, in the area of Kyzylgaya, Georgian troops unexpectedly attacked the khans: they were captured. Haji Celebi himself defeated the Georgians in the battle near Ganja and came to the aid of the khans. The army of Shaki khan captured Gazakh and Borchali.

In 1767, the Western part of the Shamakhi khanate was annexed to the Shaki khanate.

In 1785, the Shaki khanate became dependent on the Guba khanate. However, this did not last long: after the death of Fatali khan of Guba, the Shaki khanate regained its independence.

During the reign of Selim khan, the territory of the khanate was conditionally divided into 8 magals, which were ruled by naibs directly appointed by the khan himself.

On May 21, 1805, the treaty of Kyurekchay was signed between Russia and the Shaki khanate, the main condition of which was the annexation of the Shaki khanate to Russia. In 1806, the Russian army moved to Shaki. Selim khan was removed from positions of power. A temporary Board of Pro-Russian beks was created.

=== Modern era ===
The area was fully annexed by Russia by the Treaty of Gulistan in 1813 and the khanate was abolished in 1819 and the Shaki province was established in its place. Shaki province was merged with provinces of Shemakha, Baku, Susha, Lankaran, Derbent and Kuban in 1840 and Caspian Oblast was created. At the same time Shaki was renamed as Nuha. The oblast was dissolved in 1846 and it was raion center of Shemakha Governorate. After the earthquake in Shemakha in 1859, the governorate was renamed as Baku Governorate. On 19 February 1868, raion of Nukha was passed to the newly created Elizavetpol Governorate as the Nukha uezd. After founding of USSR, it was the center of Nukha raion. Its one was abolished on 4 January 1963 and was bounded to one of Vartashen. Nukha one was founded again in 1965 and finally, city and raion regained traditional name in 1968.

During its history, the town saw devastation many times and because of that, the oldest historic and architectural monuments currently preserved are dated to only the 16th–19th centuries. For many centuries, Shaki had a large Armenian community and has been famous for being the center of silkworm-breeding and local silk production. Originally located on the left bank of the river Kish, the town sat lower down the hill, however Shaki was moved to its present location after a devastating flood in 1772 and became the capital of Shaki Khanate. As the new location was near the village of Nukha, the city also became known as Nukha, until 1968 when it reverted to the name Shaki.

In 1829, the Khanabad factory was opened in Shaki. The products of the Nukha silk-winding factory, which opened in 1861, were awarded a medal in London in 1862. The Shaki uprising of 1838 had an impact on the administrative, judicial, and agrarian reforms of the 1840s.

In 1917, Soviets of Workers' deputies were formed in a number of cities of Azerbaijan, including Shaki.

In May 1920, Soviet power was established in Shaki, as well as in other cities of Azerbaijan.

In 1930, an uprising against the policy of collectivization in the Azerbaijan SSR broke out in the village of Bash Goynyuk in the Shaki district. The Soviet regime was abolished. Soon, Red Army units moved into the city. The rebels were subject to execution.

=== Republic era ===
A letter from the Chairman of the Kyoto City Council, Daisaku Kadokawa, on 8 December 2008, said that Sheki was a member of the World Historical Cities League. Sheki became a member after the meeting of the Board of the World Cities League in October 2008.

Works to be done in the field of renovation and construction in 2012 were identified: Together with Sheki City Executive Authority and Architectural Urbanization Committee, Shaki City General Plan was prepared. According to the General Plan, it was planned to implement a number of infrastructure projects, as well as the expansion of the city to the west, inclusion of city of Oxud, İncə, Shaki, Kish, and Qoxmuq villages to Shaki.

== Geography ==
Shaki is surrounded by snowy peaks of the Greater Caucasus, which in some places reaches 3000–3600 m. Shaki's climate includes a range of cyclones and anticyclones, air masses and local winds. The average annual temperature in Shaki is 12 °C. In June and August, the average temperature varies between 20 and 25 °C.

The mountain forests around the area prevent the city from floods and overheating of the area during summer. The main rivers of the city are the Kish and Gurjhana. During the Soviet rule of Azerbaijan, many ascended to Shaki to bathe in its prestigious mineral springs.

=== Climate ===
Shaki's climate is humid temperate, classified as Cfa in Köppen climate classification and Do in Trewartha climate classification.

Climate data for Shaki (1971-1990 normals)
Month	Jan	Feb	Mar	Apr	May	Jun	Jul	Aug	Sep	Oct	Nov	Dec	Year
Mean daily maximum °C (°F)	4.6 (40.3)	5.1 (41.2)	9.5 (49.1)	17.3 (63.1)	21.6 (70.9)	25.8 (78.4)	29.5 (85.1)	28.6 (83.5)	24.6 (76.3)	17.4 (63.3)	17.3 (63.1)	7.6 (45.7)	17.4 (63.3)
Daily mean °C (°F)	0.9 (33.6)	1.5 (34.7)	4.9 (40.8)	11.6 (52.9)	16.3 (61.3)	20.4 (68.7)	24.0 (75.2)	22.9 (73.2)	18.9 (66.0)	12.5 (54.5)	7.5 (45.5)	2.8 (37.0)	12.0 (53.6)
Mean daily minimum °C (°F)	−2.0 (28.4)	−1.4 (29.5)	2.1 (35.8)	8.0 (46.4)	12.1 (53.8)	16.2 (61.2)	19.3 (66.7)	18.3 (64.9)	14.7 (58.5)	9.0 (48.2)	4.3 (39.7)	0.4 (32.7)	8.4 (47.2)
Average precipitation mm (inches)	34 (1.3)	50 (2.0)	62 (2.4)	83 (3.3)	102 (4.0)	85 (3.3)	61 (2.4)	57 (2.2)	57 (2.2)	99 (3.9)	55 (2.2)	28 (1.1)	773 (30.3)
Average rainy days	6	9	11	10	11	8	6	5	6	8	7	5	92
Source: NOAA

== Demographics ==
According to the 1917 publication of the Caucasian Calendar, Shaki, then known as Nukha, had a population of 52,243 in 1916, including 33,813 Sunni Muslims (64.7%), 9,588 Shia Muslims (18.4%), and 8,009 Armenians (15.3%).

The number of Shaki population is 174.1 thousand people. The rural population is 105.7 thousand people, while the urban population is 66.9 thousand people. Population density is 72 people per square kilometer. Of the total population, 86.4 thousand, or 49.6%, are men and 87.7 thousand, or 50.4%, are women, with 38.4 percent of the population living in the city and 61.6 percent living in the village.

=== Religion ===
Church of Kish in Shaki (2026)

A home to ancient Caucasian Albanian churches, religion is highly important to the people of Shaki due to its historical religious diversity. There are many churches and mosques in the city. Some churches such as the Church of Kish in the vicinity of Shaki are thought to be approximately 1,500 years old. The Khan's Mosque, Omar Efendi Mosque and Gileili Minaret are considered important places of worship in the city.

== Economy ==
During 1850–70, Shaki became international silk production centre. More than 200 European companies opened offices in the city, while silkworms to the tune of 3 million roubles were sold to them in a year.

Shaki possesses a small silk industry and relies on its agricultural sector, which produces tobacco, grapes, cattle, nuts, cereals and milk. The main production facilities of Shaki are the silk factory, gas-power plant, brick factory, wine factory, sausage factory, conserve factory, and a dairy plant with its integrated big scale Pedigree Dairy Farm.

In 2010, Shaki was visited by 15,000 foreign tourists from all around the world.

== Culture ==
Shaki has a high density of cultural resources and monuments that include 2700 years of Azerbaijani history. The city has many houses with red roofs. In pop culture, a well-known feature of Shakinians is their sense of humor and comic tales. Shaki's comic tales hero Hacı dayı (Uncle Haji) is the subject of many jokes in the area.

Shaki has always played a central role in Azerbaijani art and more generally in the art and architecture of Azerbaijan. Under the name of Nukha, the city is the scene of much of the action in Brecht's play The Caucasian Chalk Circle.

In the second half of the 19th century. Nukha was ranked second in terms of trade and industry development. New types of city and county schools were created.

According to the Resolution of the Council of Ministers of the Azerbaijani SSR No. 97 of March 6, 1968, the "Yukhary Bash" area in Nukha was declared an architectural reserve.

In 1975, the construction of the drama theater building was completed in Shaki.

In 1983, the Shaki craft Museum opened.

=== Architecture ===
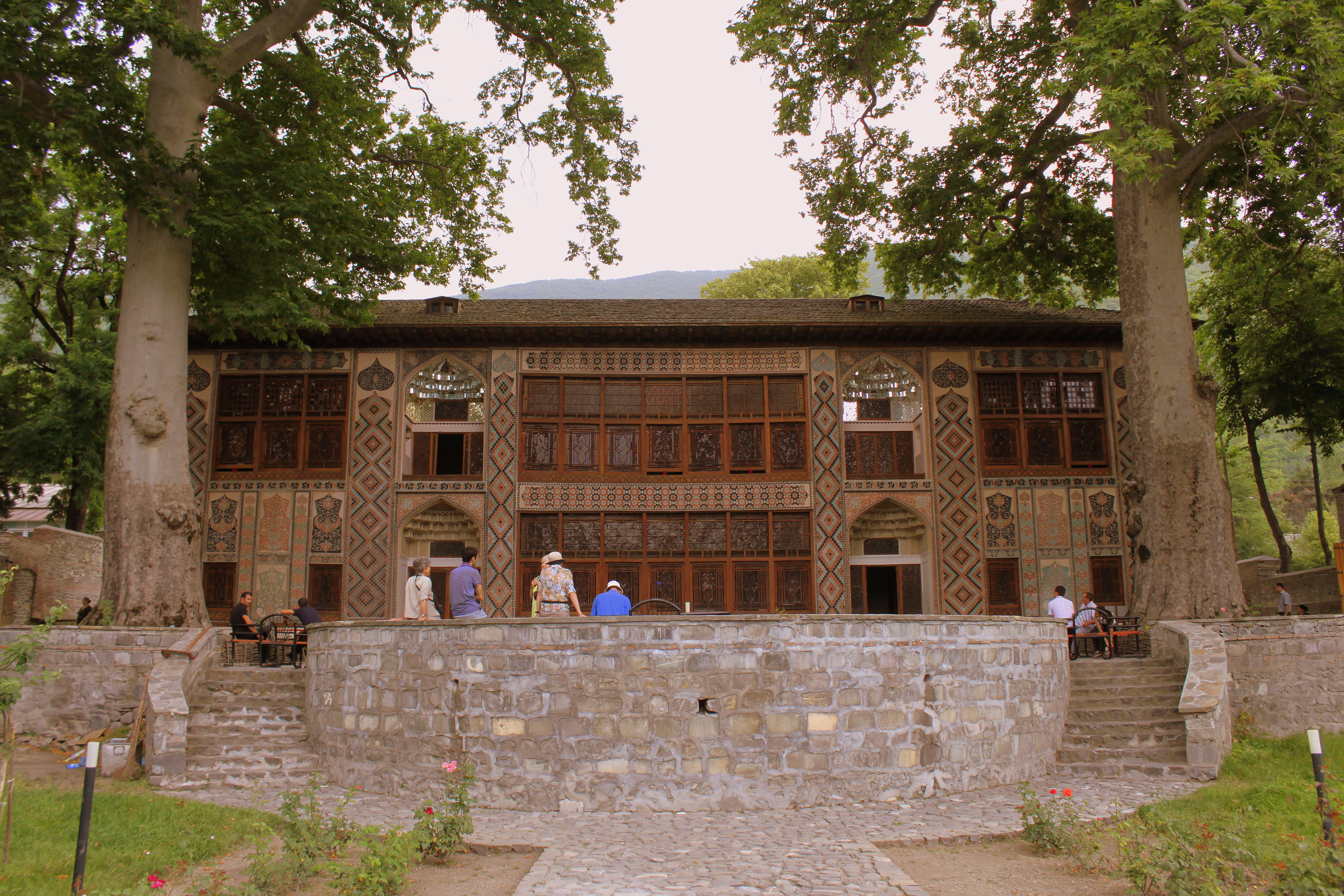
The Palace of Shaki Khans – seat of Shaki khans.

Architecture in Shaki has largely been shaped by Shaki's history. It goes back to a time, when it was a market center on the Silk Road, linking Dagestan, Russia to the northern trade routes through the Caucasus.

The city's central and main open city squares are dominated by two Soviet towers. Many public places and private houses in Shaki are decorated with shebeke, a wooden lattice of pieces of coloured glass, held together without glue or a single nail. The technique is complex and known only to a few artisans who pass their meticulous craft from generation to generation.

The Palace of Shaki Khans which was a summer residence of Shaki Khans, still remains one of the most visible landmarks of Shaki. Constructed in 1762 without a single nail is one of the most marvelous monuments of its epoch. Displayed within the palace are Azerbaijani Khanate-era artifacts, as well as displays of the art scene, considered to be among the finest in the world. Historic Centre of Sheki with the Khan's Palace was added to UNESCO's World Heritage List during the 43rd session of the World Heritage Committee held in July 2019.

The Shaki Castle which was built by the founder of the Shaki Khanate Haji Chelebi Khan (1743–1755), near the village of Nukha on the southern foothills of the Caucasus. The fortress walls are close to a thousand and two hundred meters long and over two meters thick. Protected by numerous bastions, the fortress is entered by two main gates from the north and south. At the height of the khanate, the fortress contained a gated palatial complex and public and commercial structures of the city, while the residential quarter was situated outside its walls. It was restored extensively between 1958 and 1963. Many years Shaki fortress safeguarded approaches to the city, the acts of bravery by its defendants of fight with foreign oppressors had been written in many history books. In Leo Tolstoy's well-known Hadji Murat novel, Shaki fortress had selected as place of events.

=== Sightseeing places ===
- The fortress (19th century);
- Shaki Khan's mosque (18th century);
- Upper caravanserai (18th century);
- Lower caravanserai (17th century);
- The house of Shaki khans (18th century);
- The minaret of the Gileyli mosque (18th century)
- Godak minaret mosque; (19th century);
- Juma mosque (19th century);
- Mosque of Omar Efendi (19th century);
- Mosque "Kyshlak" (19th century);
- Eight-sided minaret (19th century);
- Topgaraaghaj mosque (19th century);
- Underground bath (19th century);
- "Aguanlar" bath (19th century);
- Qishlaq Bath (19th century);
- Dara Bathhouse(19th century);
- The round temple (19th century);
- The bridge on the Gurjanachai river (18th—19th centuries);
- The remains of the Gelesan-Goresen fortress
- The house-museum of Mirza Fatali Akhundov;
- The house-museum of Rashid bey Efendiyev;
- The House of Haji Zulgadar Zulfugarov;
- The house-museum of Sabit Rahman.
- Dadanov's property (early 20th century)

=== Cuisine ===
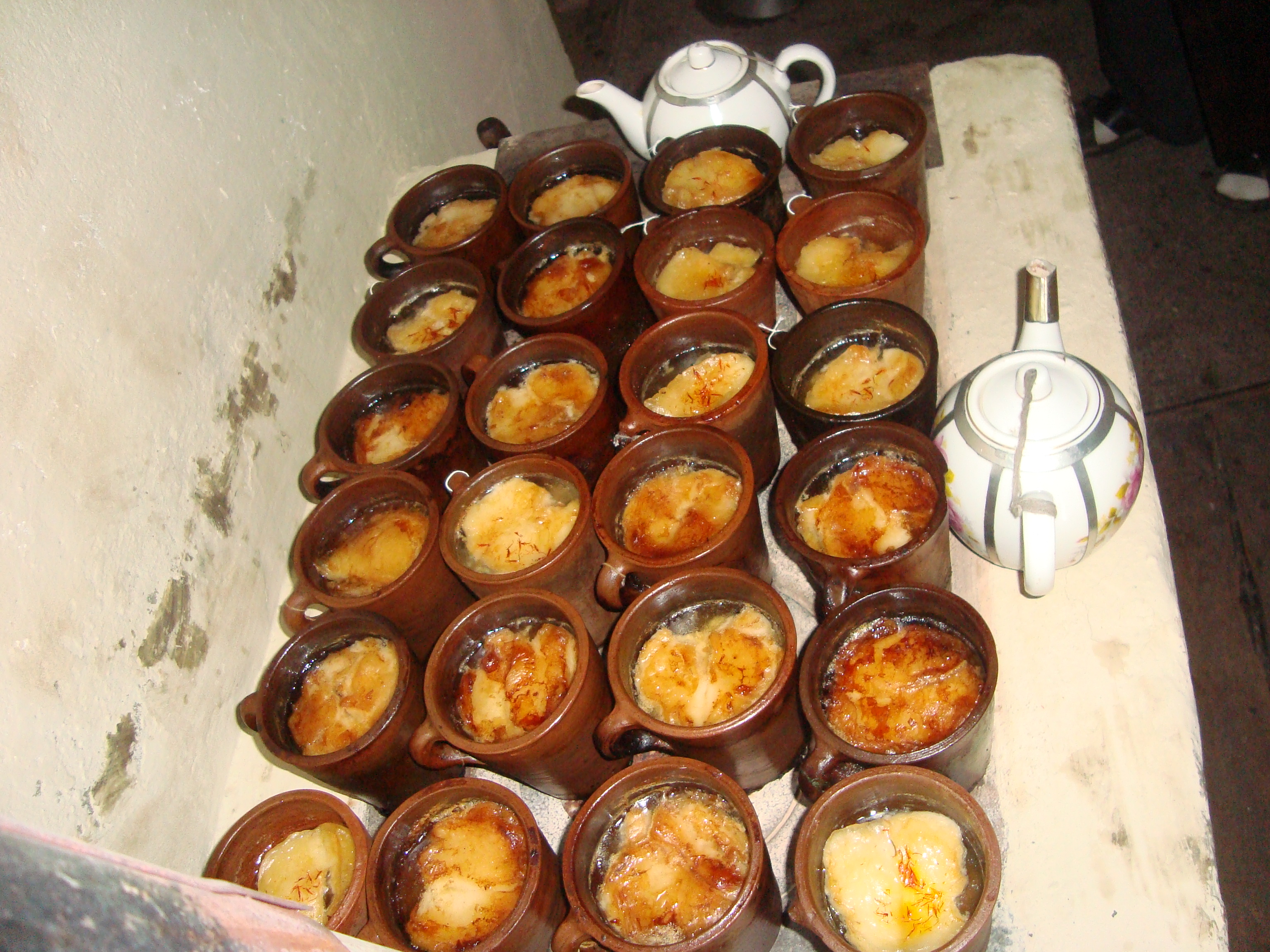
Piti is type of food specific to Shaki

Perhaps the best-known aspect of Shaki cooking is its rich sweet dishes. Shaki is traditionally held as the home of special type of baklava, called Shaki Halva. Others include nabat boiled sugar and sweet pesheveng.

Shaki also has some famous dishes, including girmabadam, zilviya, piti, a stew created with meat and potatoes and prepared in a terracotta pot.

=== Language ===
The city of Shaki has developed its own dialect of Azerbaijani language, which is mainly spoken in the city, and the region of Shaki District. Residents of city are known for their cheerful intonation of the words.

=== Museums ===
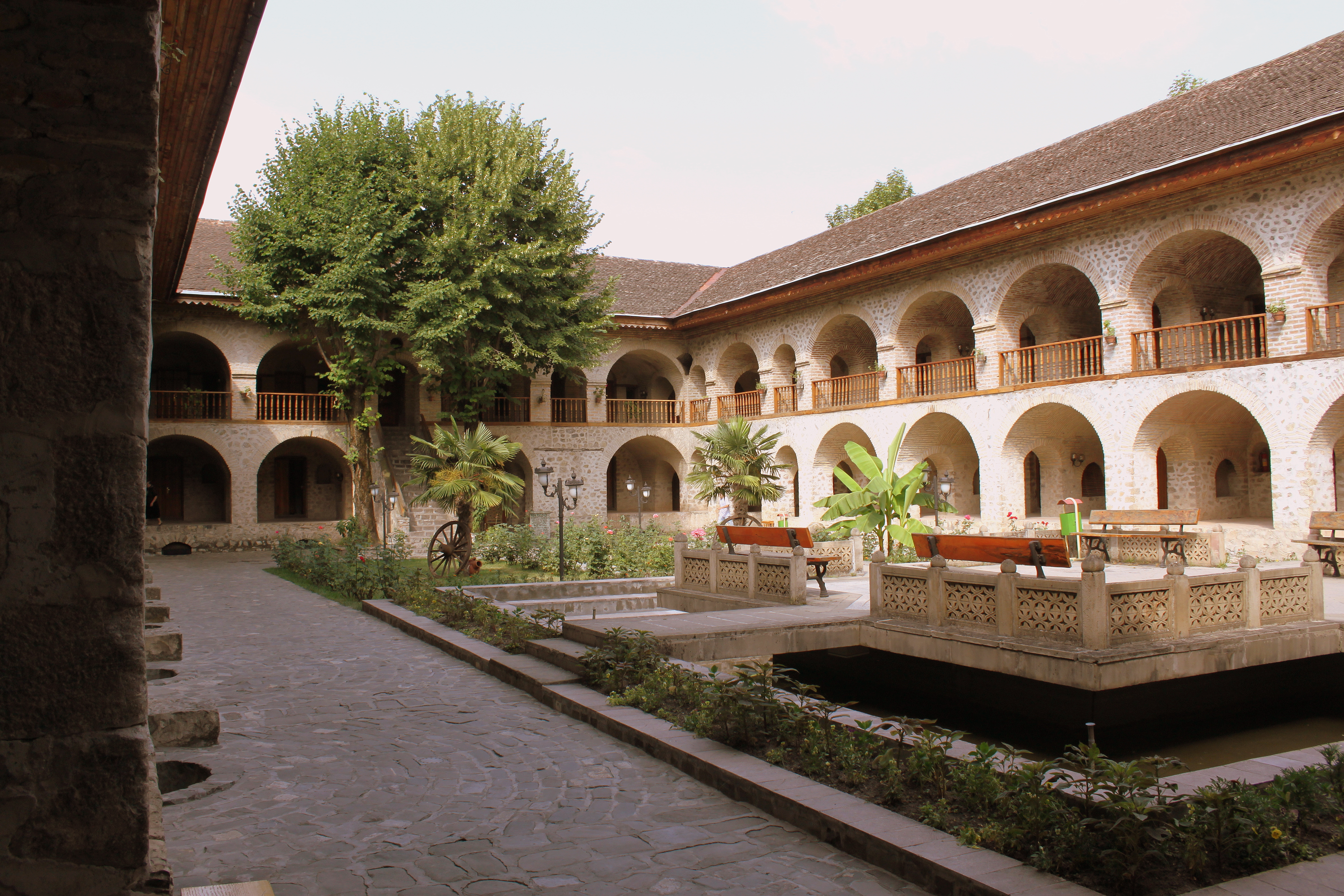
Shaki Caravanserai

Shaki hosts a wealth of historical museums and some of the most important in the country. The Shaki History Museum is one of the main museums, considered one of the most important for artifacts of the Khanate period.

As of the 18th century, five big Caravanserais (Isfahan, Tabriz, Lezgi, Ermeni and Taze) were active in Shaki but only two of them have survived. The upper and lower Caravanserais were built in the 18th century and used by merchants to store their goods in cellars, who traded on the first floor, and lived on the second. Both Caravanserais includes view of all convenience and safety of merchants and their goods.

=== Music and media ===
The city is home of the annual Mugham Festival and Silk Road International Music Festival.

The regional channel Kanal-S, newspapers Shaki and Shakinin Sasi are headquartered in the city.

== Transport ==
There is a daily overnight train to and from Baku on the Baku–Balakan route.

== Education ==
Shaki branch of the Azerbaijan Pedagogical University, Sheki Regional College, 84 general and vocational schools operate in Shaki.

== Notable residents ==
The city's notable residents include: Fatali Khan Khoyski, prime minister of Azerbaijan Democratic Republic, Ahmadiyya Jabrayilov, an activist of the French Resistance, poet Bakhtiyar Vahabzadeh, composer Jovdat Hajiyev, film director Rasim Ojagov, actor Lutfali Abdullayev, religious leader Mahammad Hasan Movlazadeh Shakavi, and others.

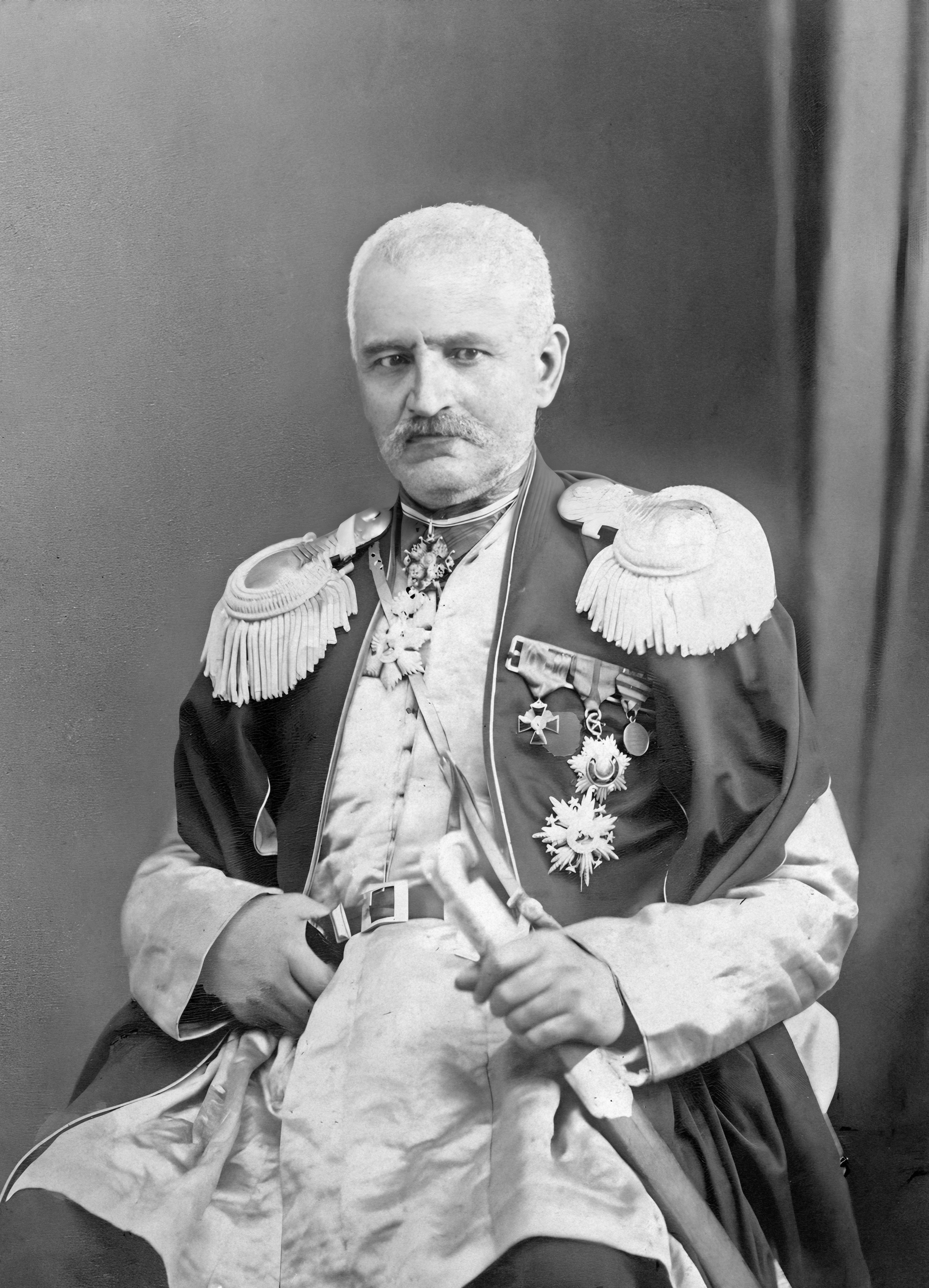
Mirza Fatali Akhundov, founder of materialism and atheism movement in Azerbaijan and modern Iranian literature, as well as one of the forerunners of Iranian nationalism

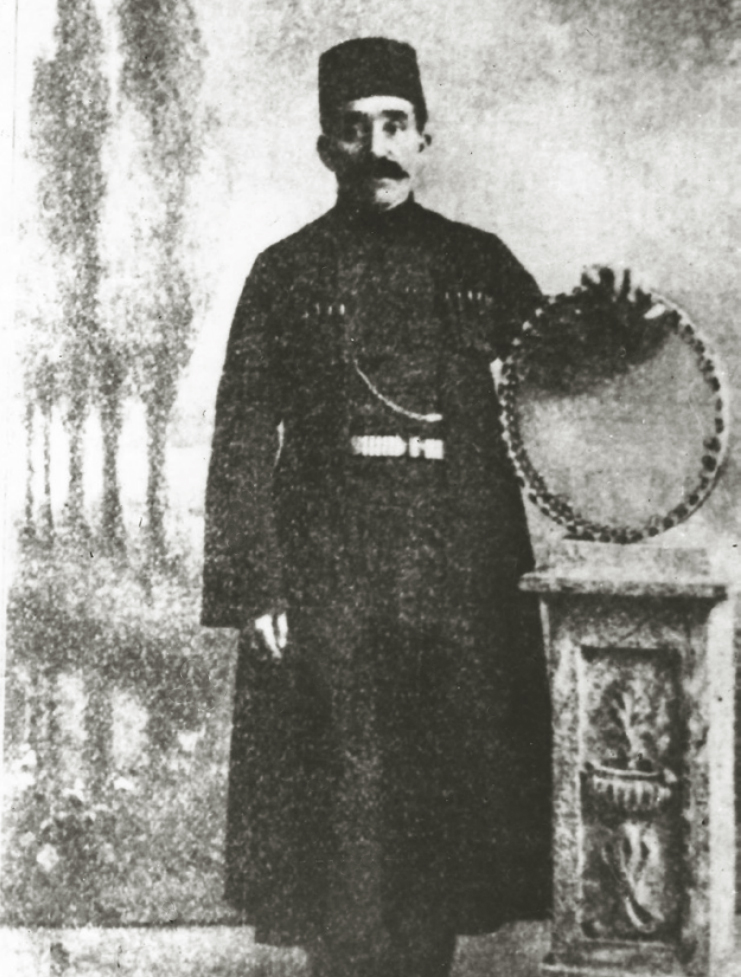
Shakili Alasgar, mugham performer.

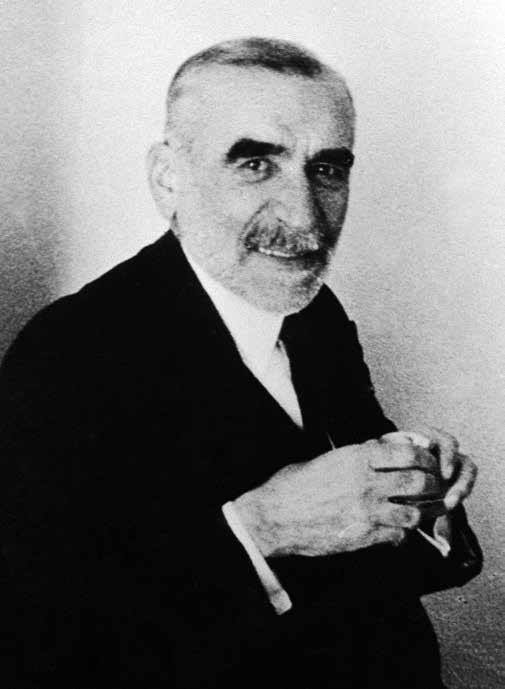
Abdulali bey Amirjanov, was member of Azerbaijani National Council.

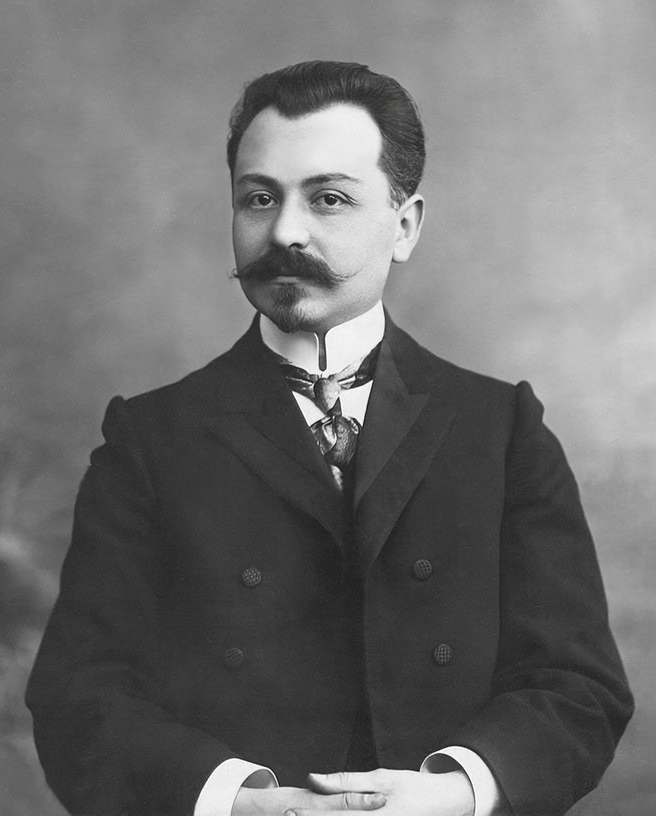
Fatali Khan Khoyski, the first Prime Minister of the independent Azerbaijan Democratic Republic.

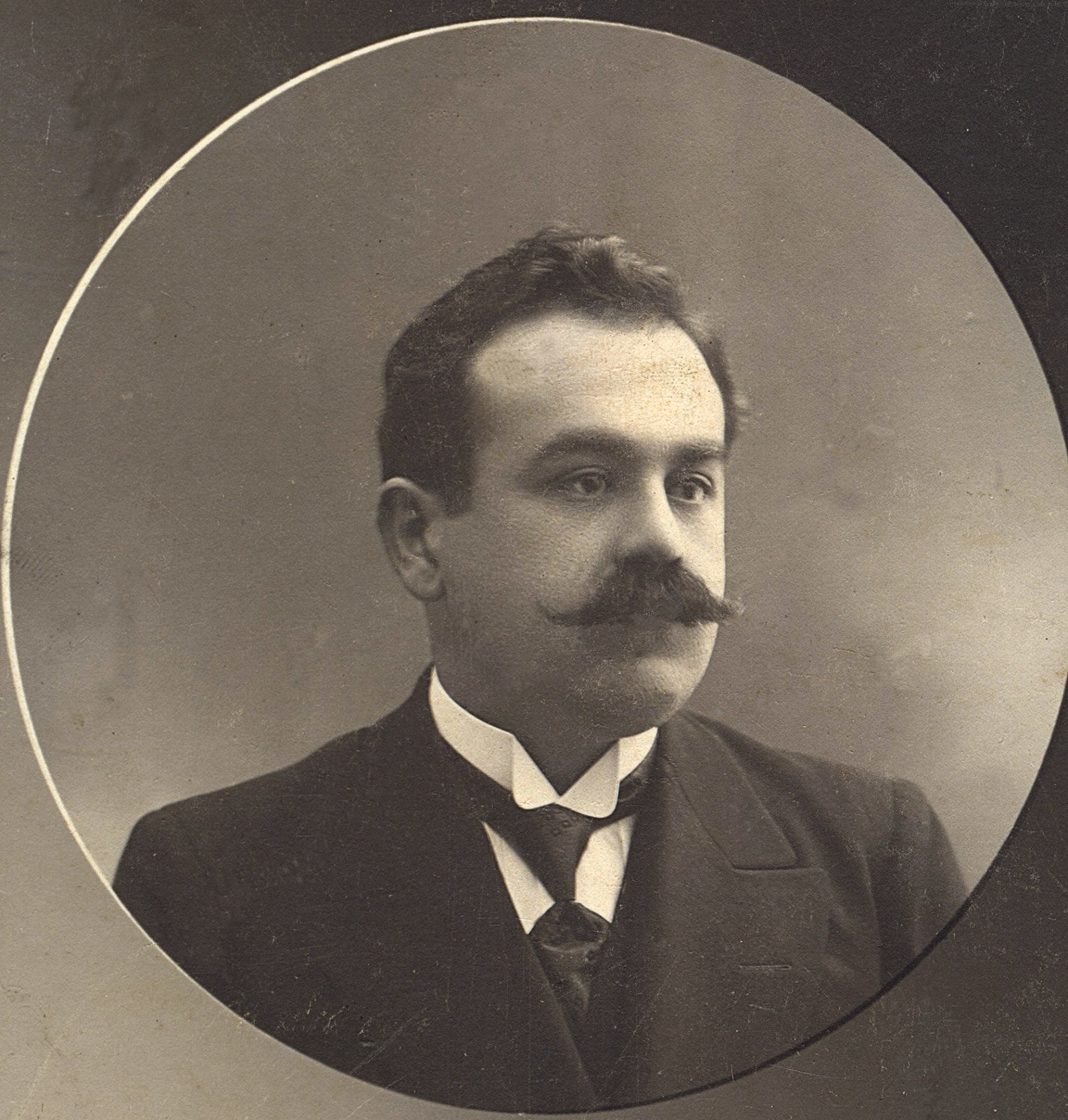
Salman Mumtaz, Azerbaijani literary scholar and poet.

== Gallery ==
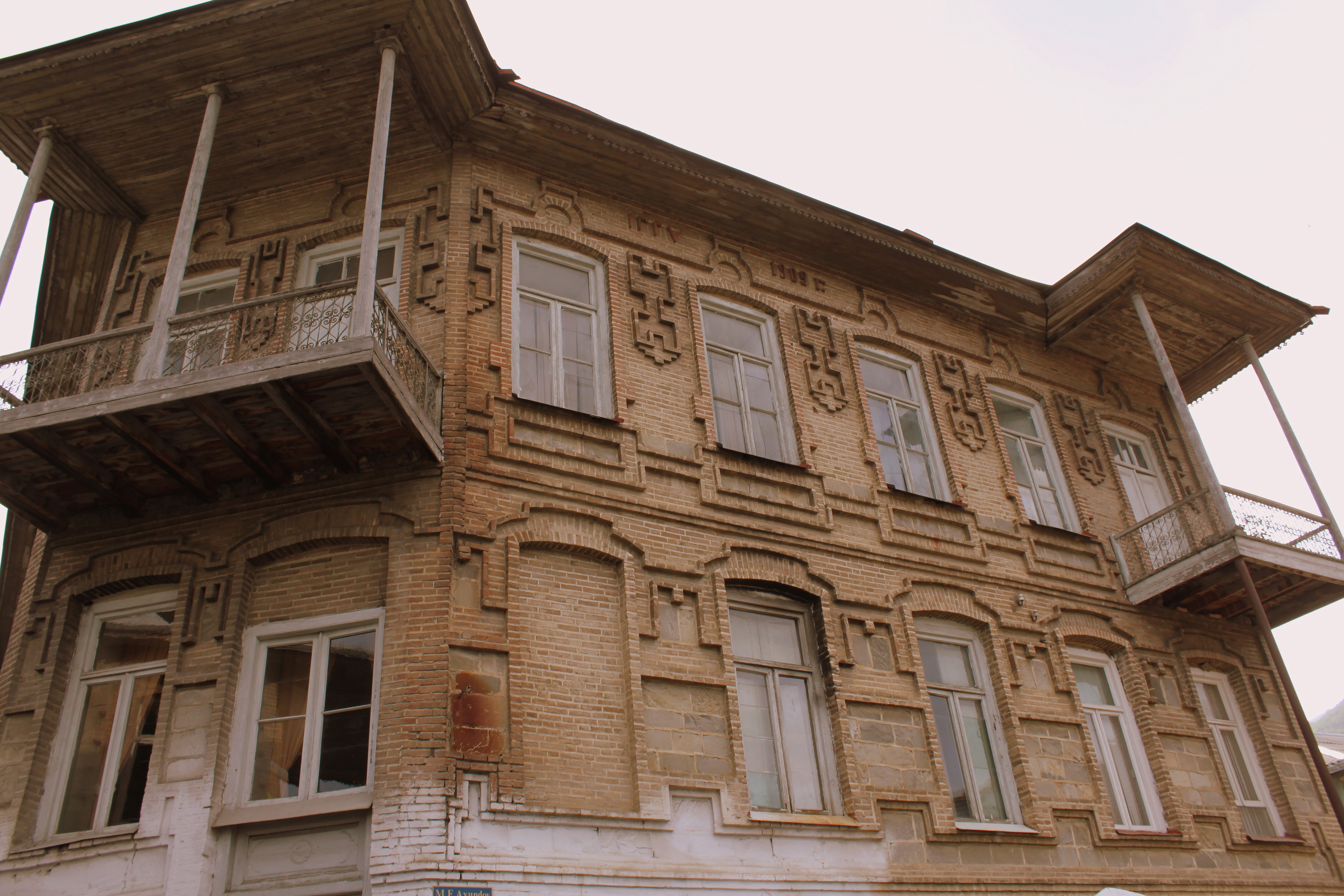
Old house in Shaki

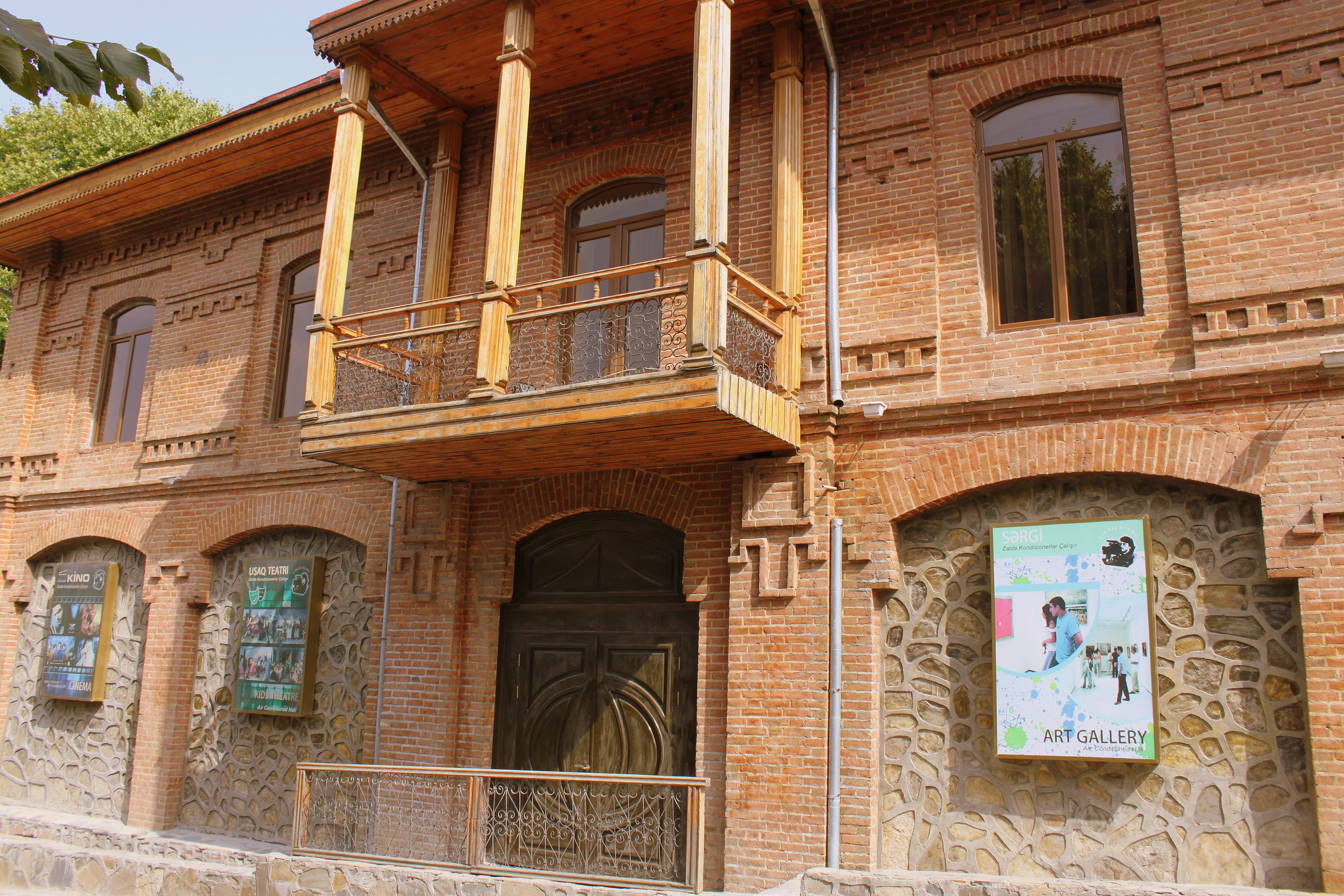
Shaki House of Culture

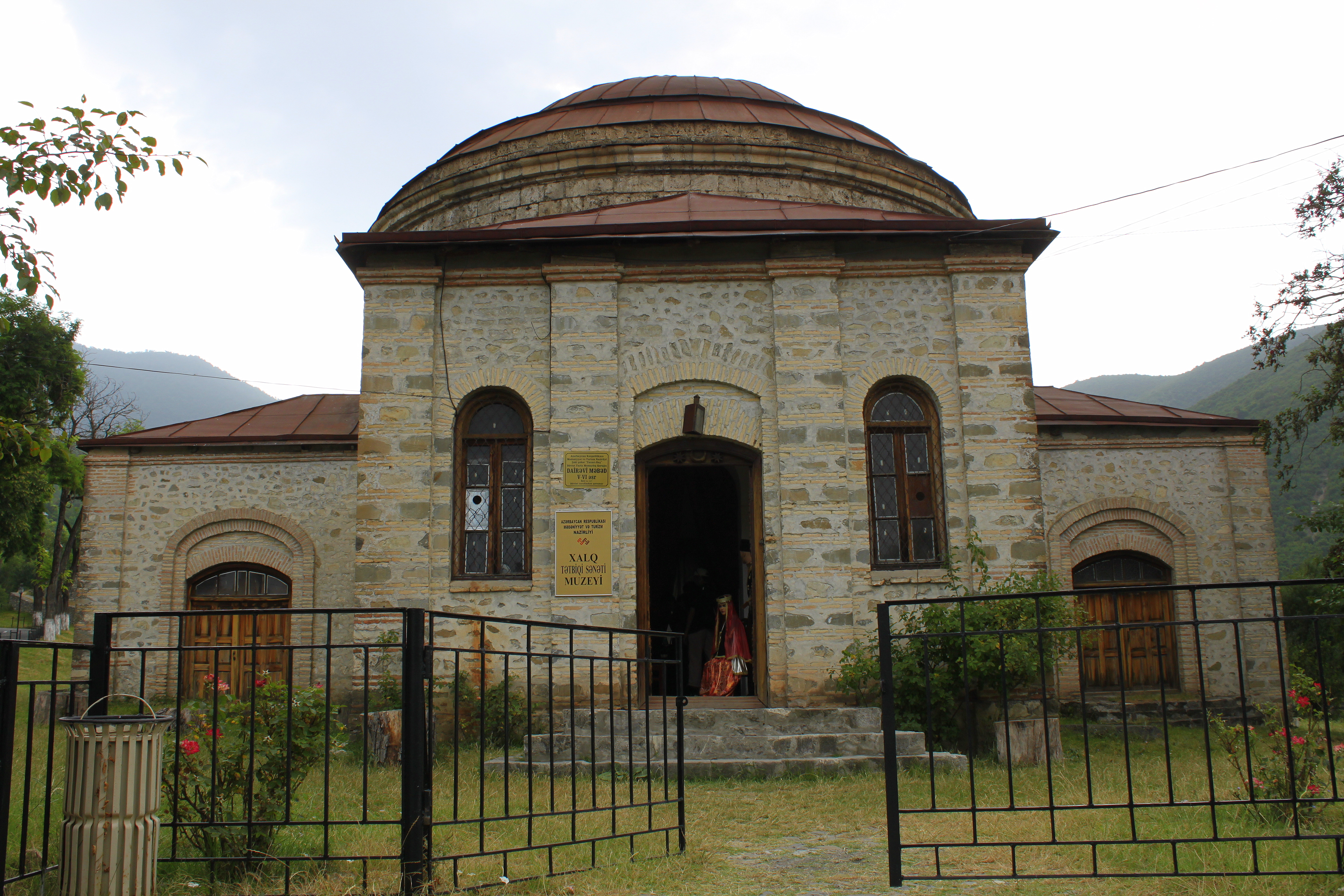
Front view of Albanian church

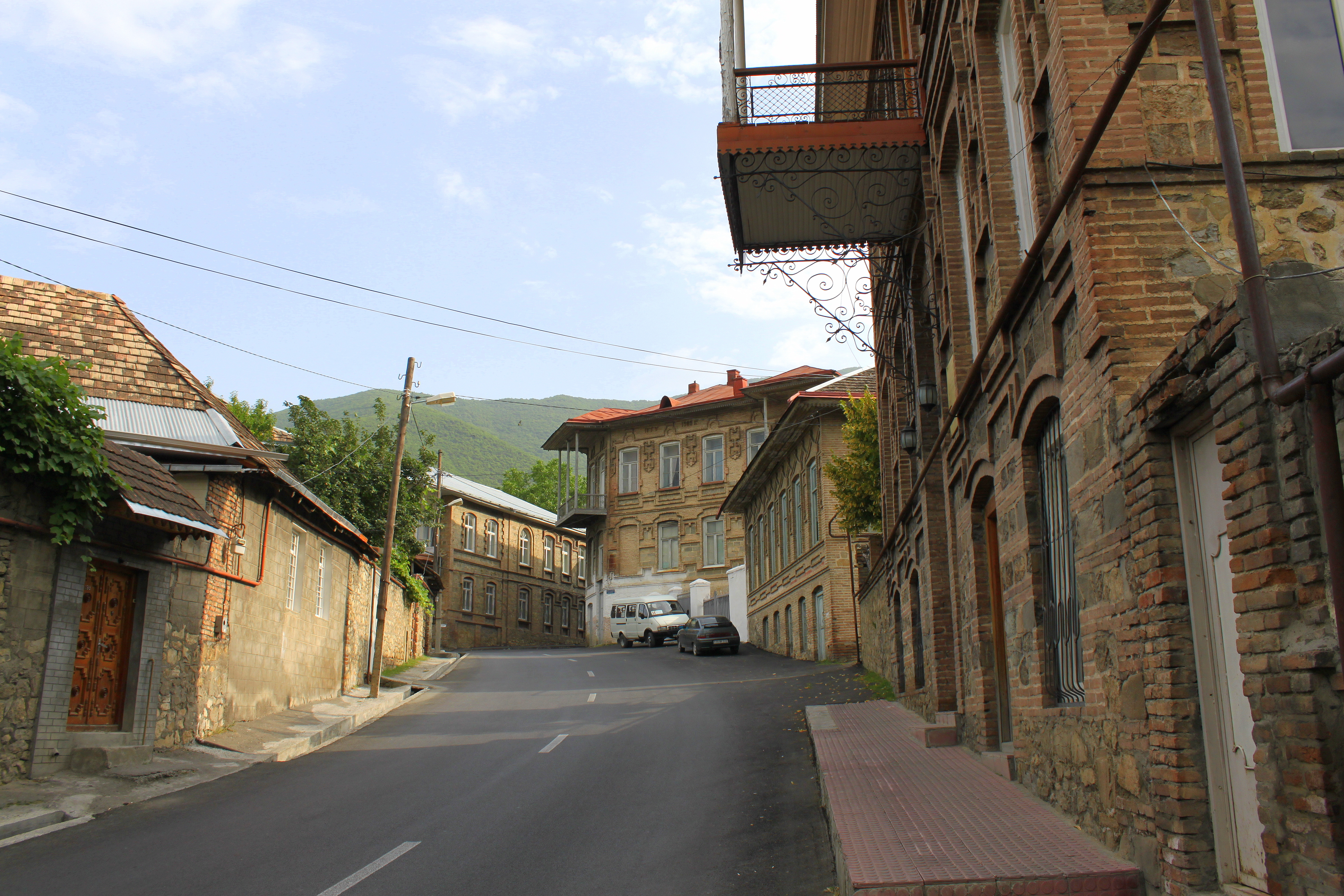
One of the old streets of Shaki

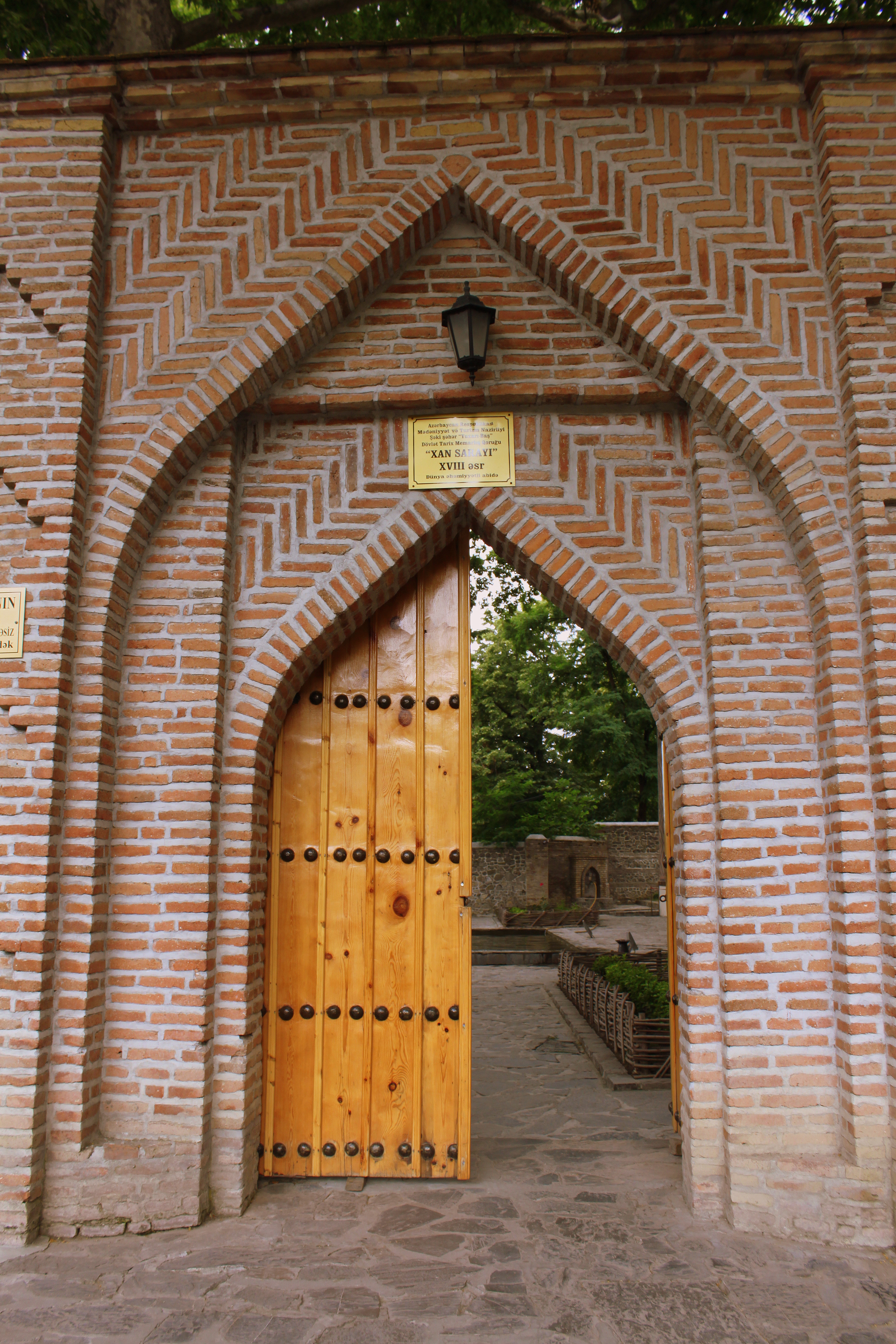
Door of Shaki Khan Palace

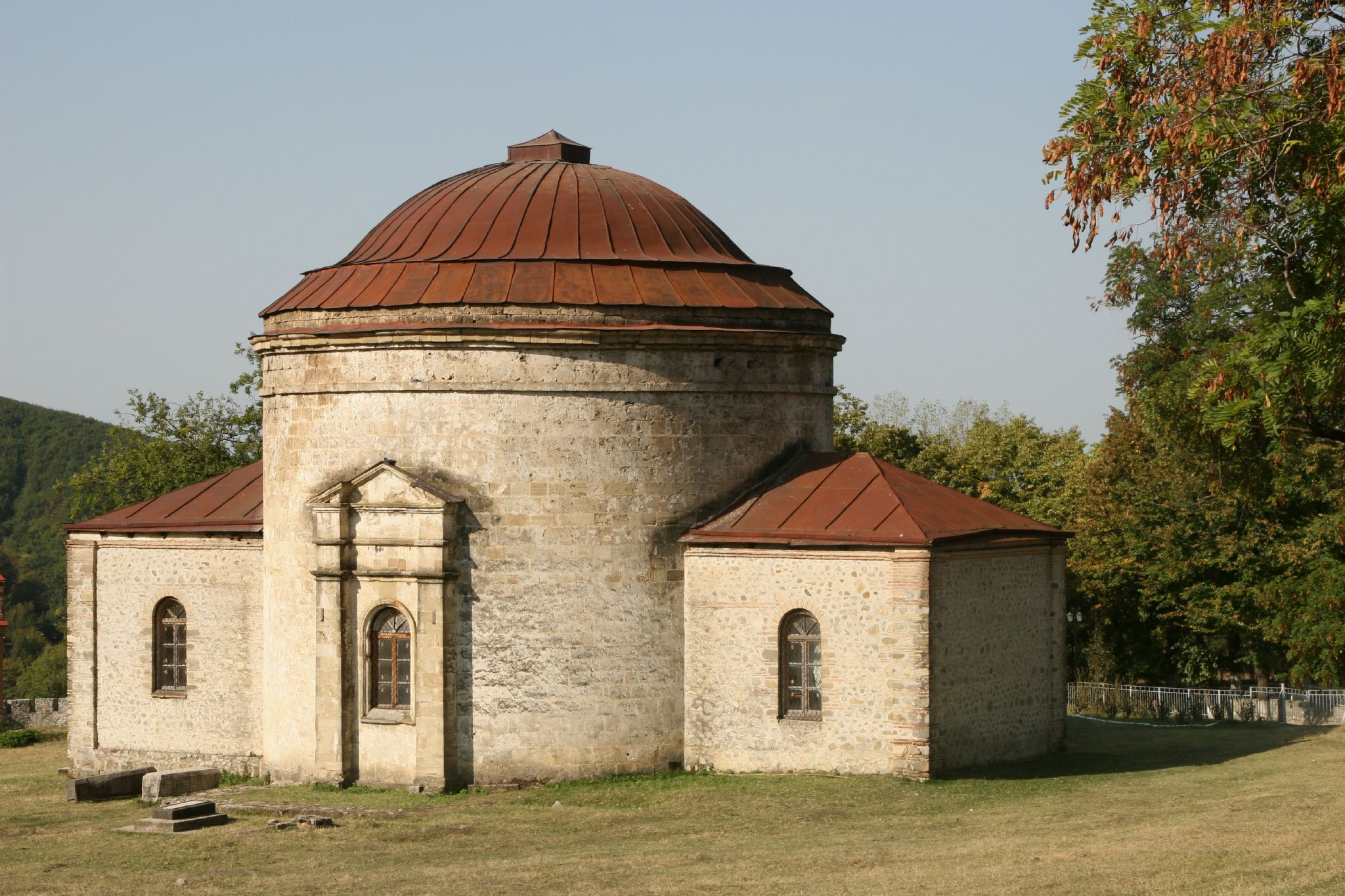
A 6th-century Caucasian Albanian church

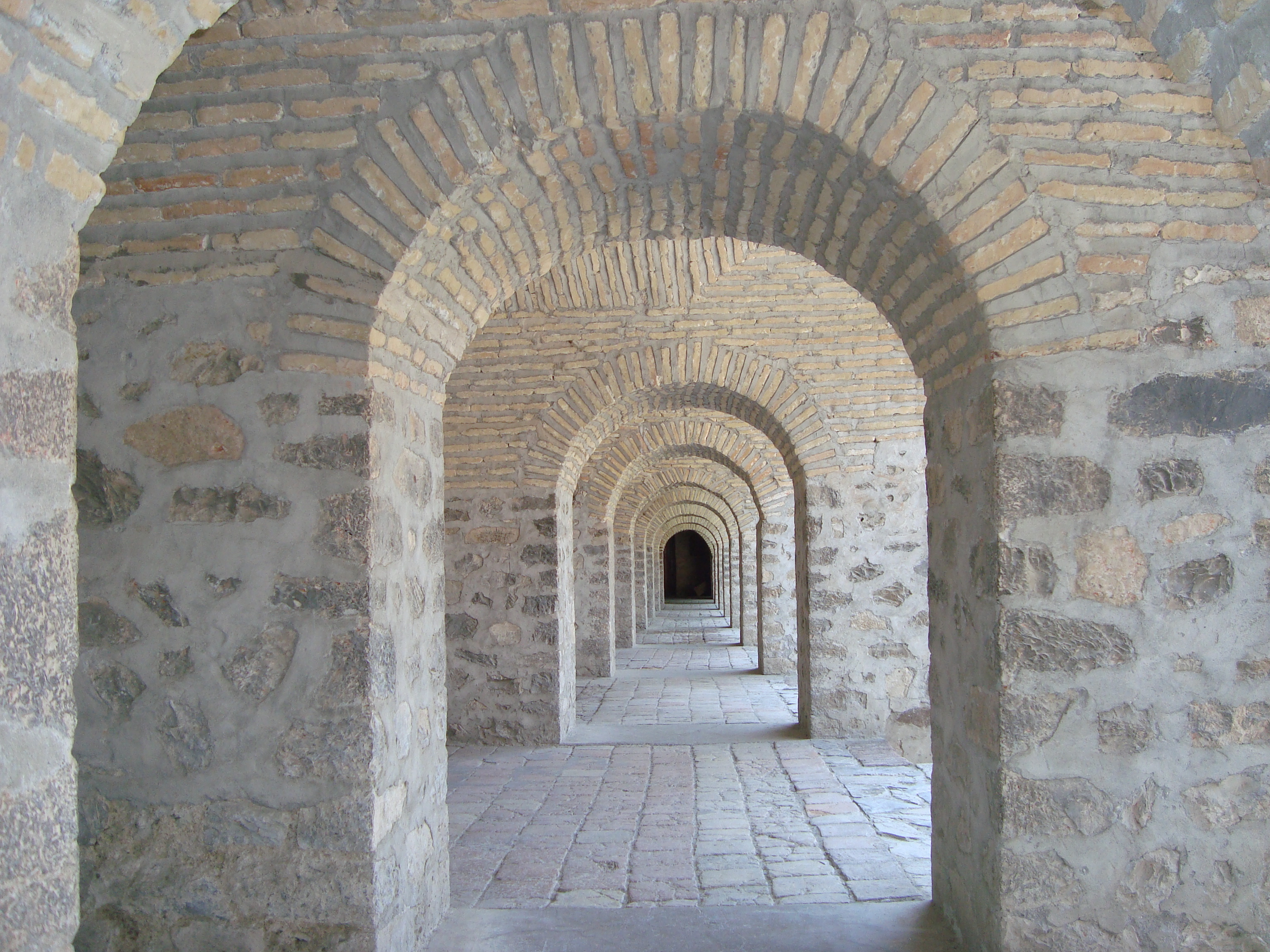
View of Shaki's Karavansarai

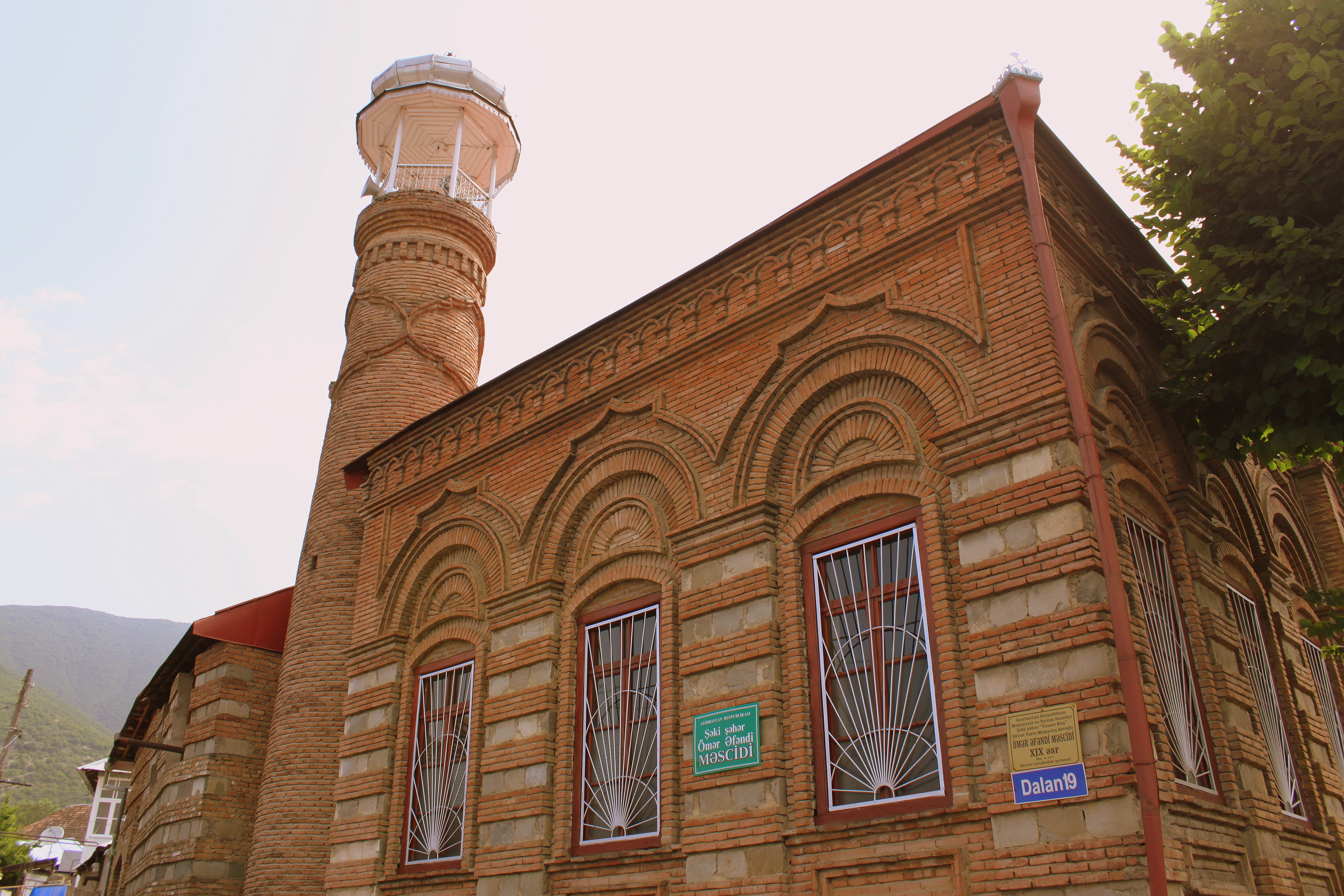
Omer Efendi Mosque

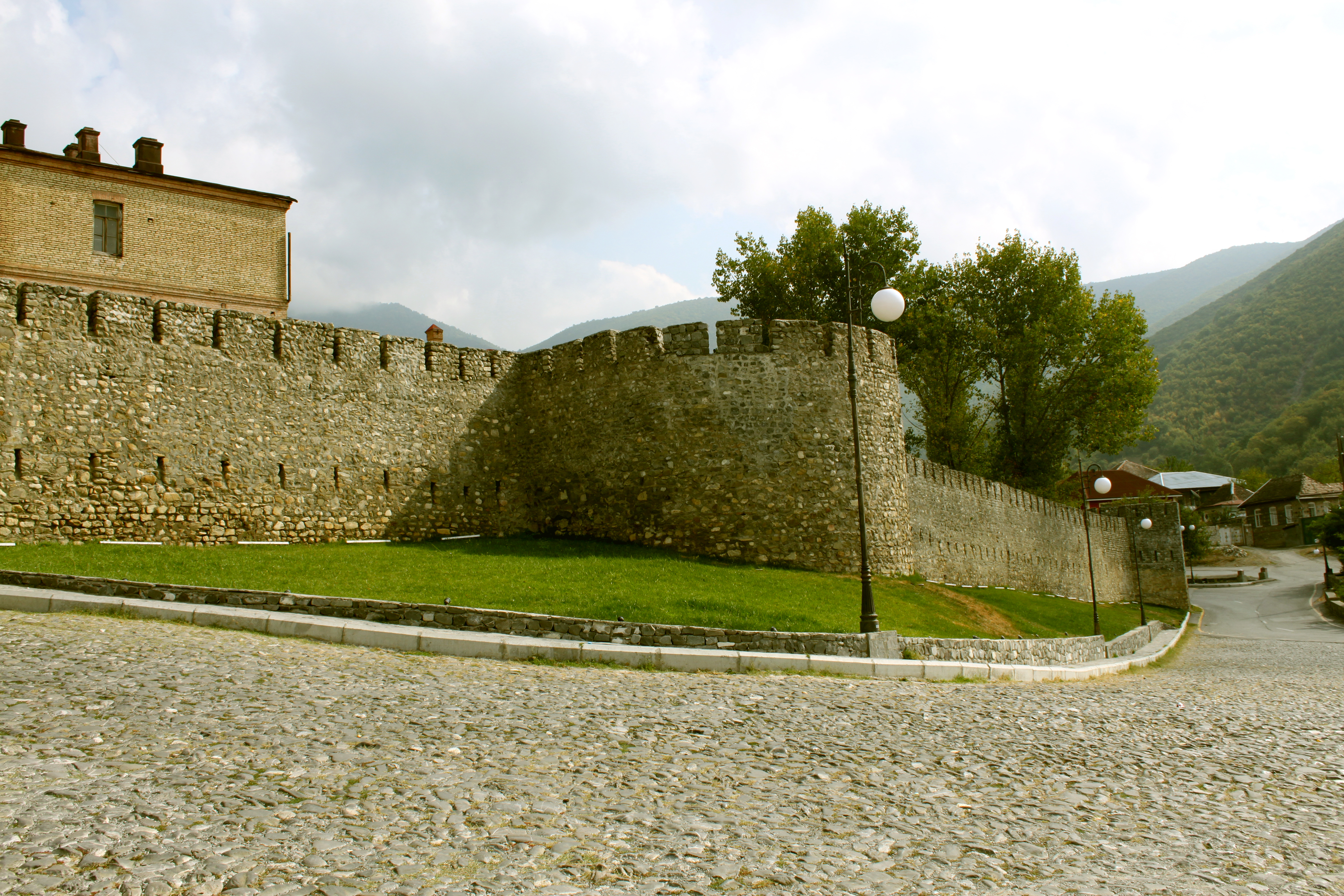
Shaki fortress

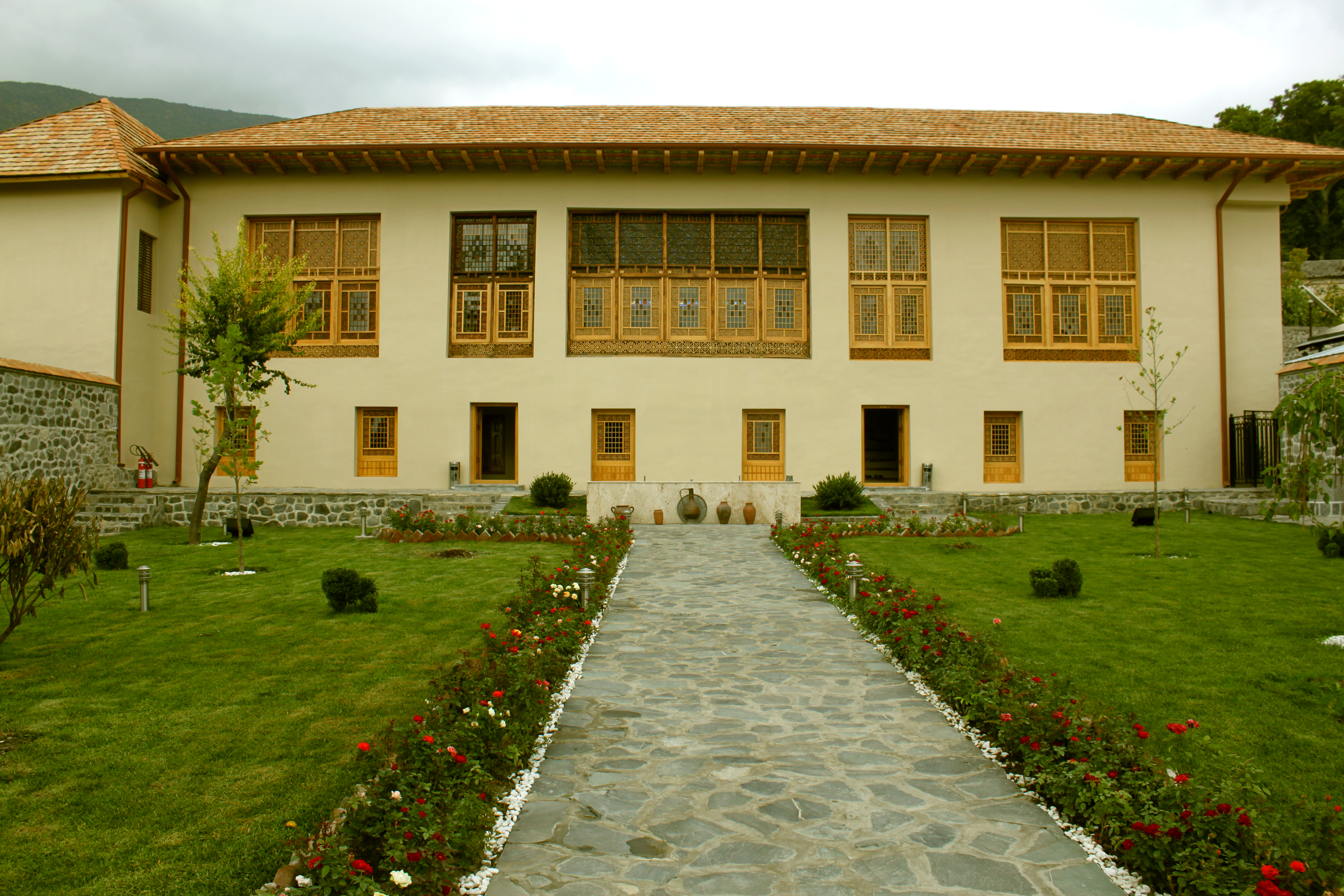
House of Shakikhanovs

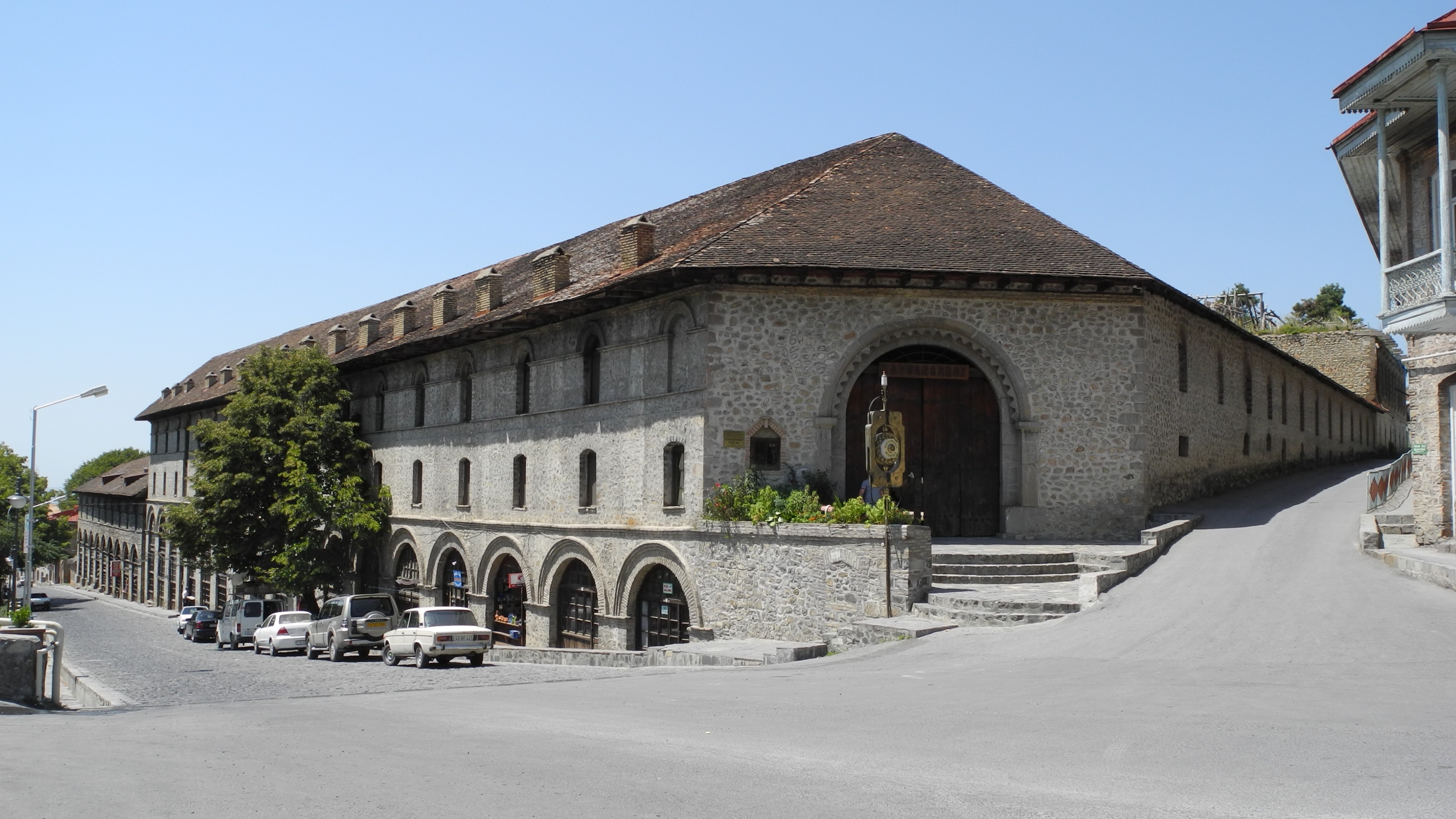
Sheki Caravanserai

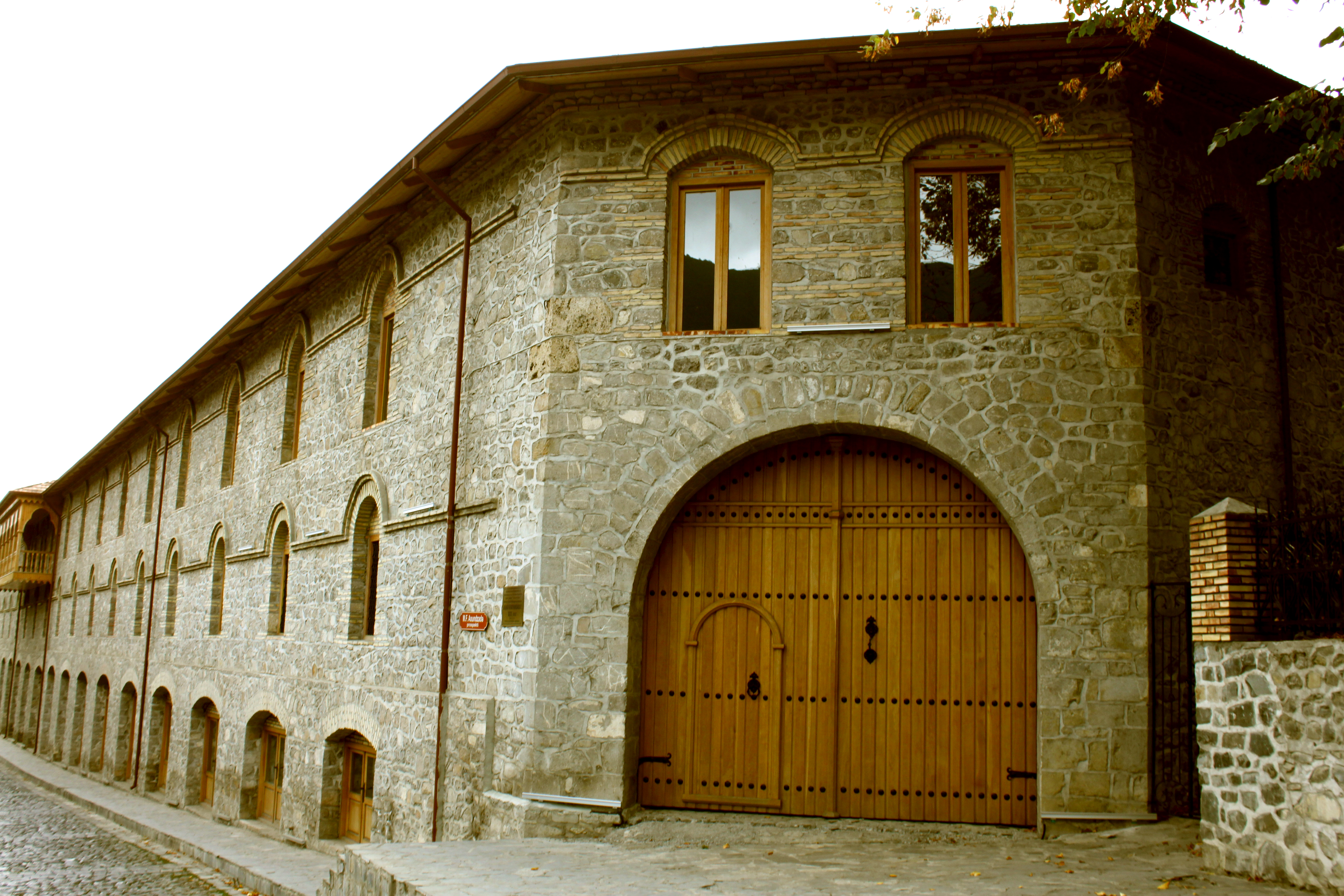
Ashagi Caravanserai

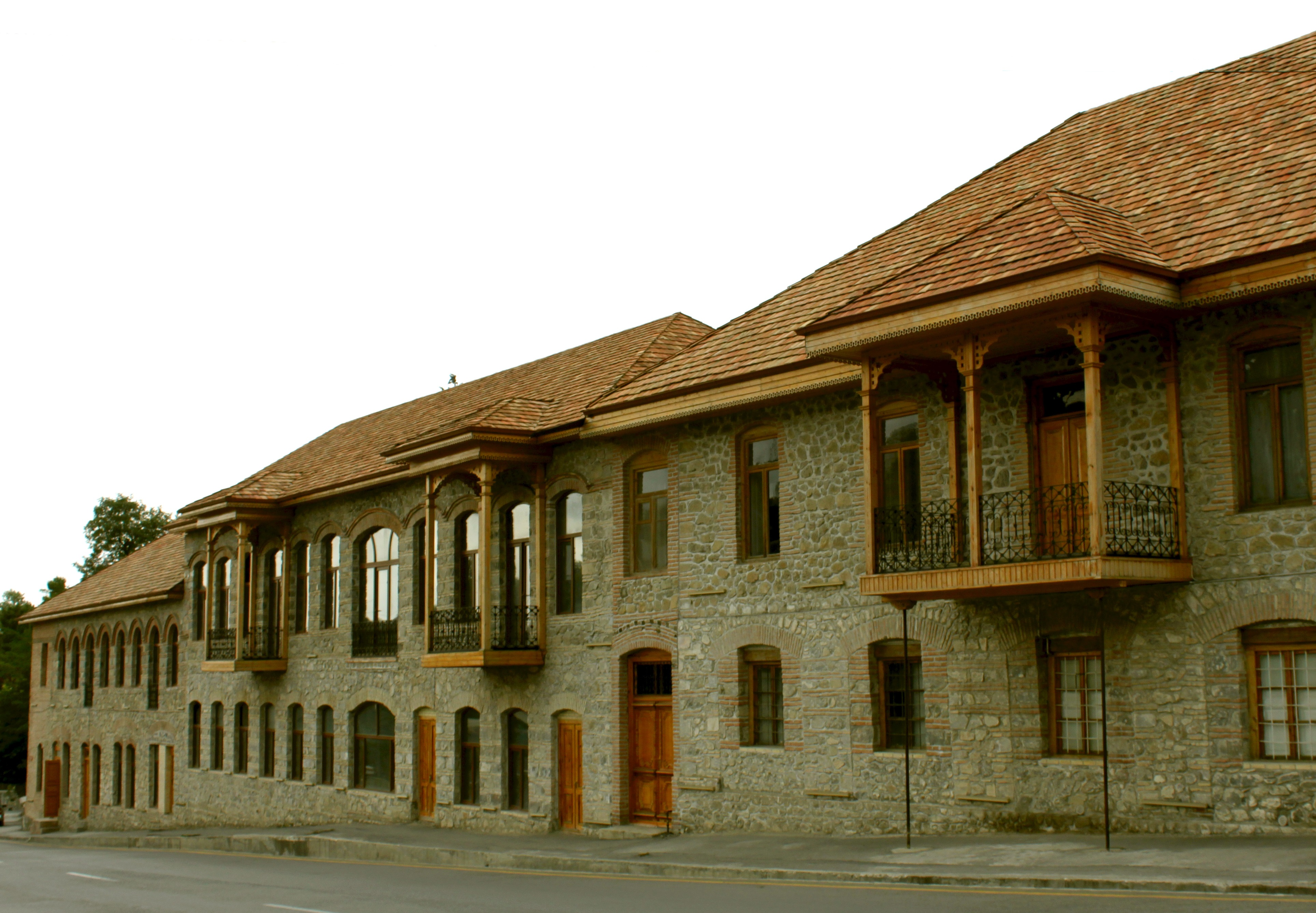
House of Farhadbayovs

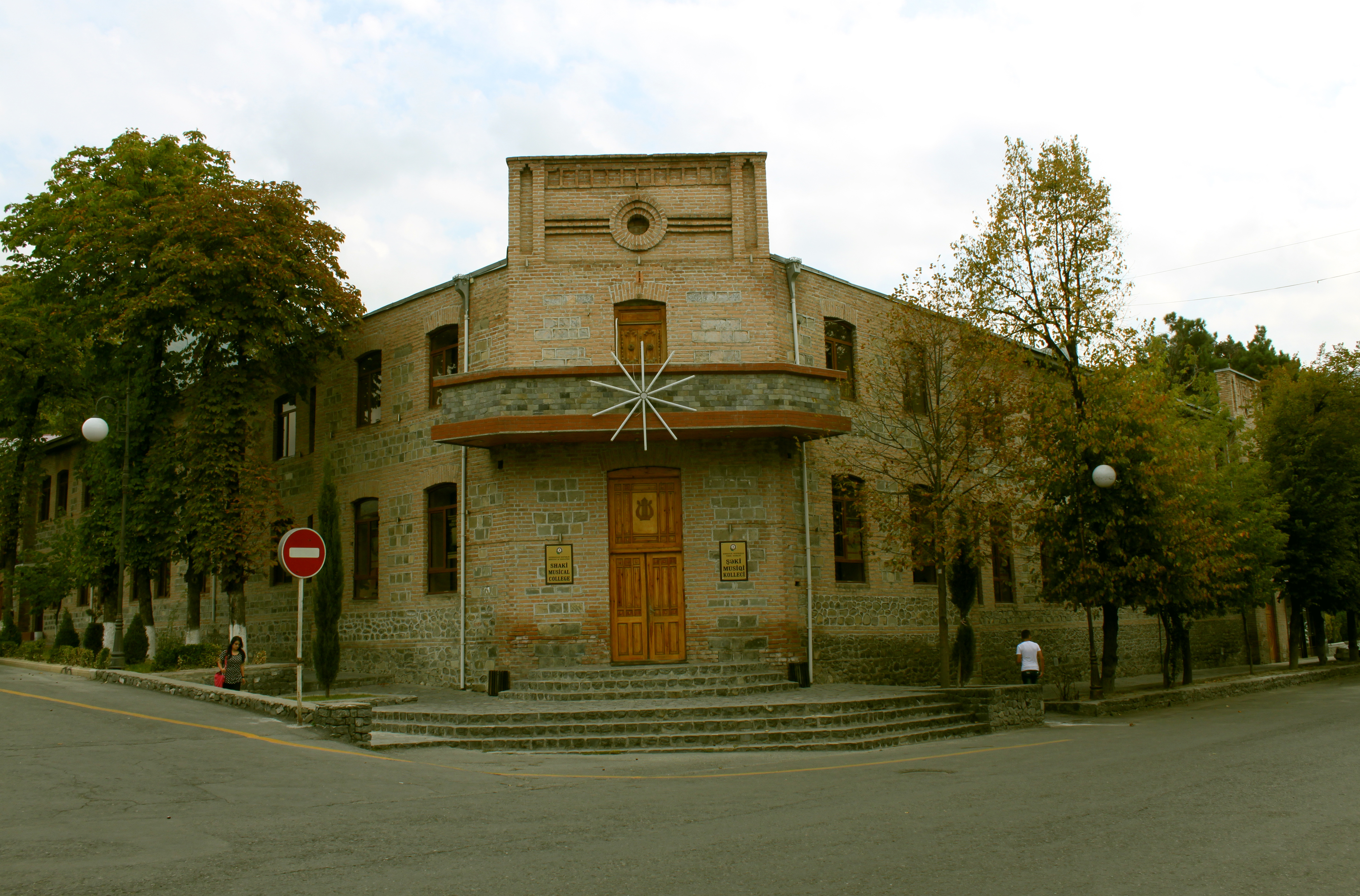
House of Alijanbayovs

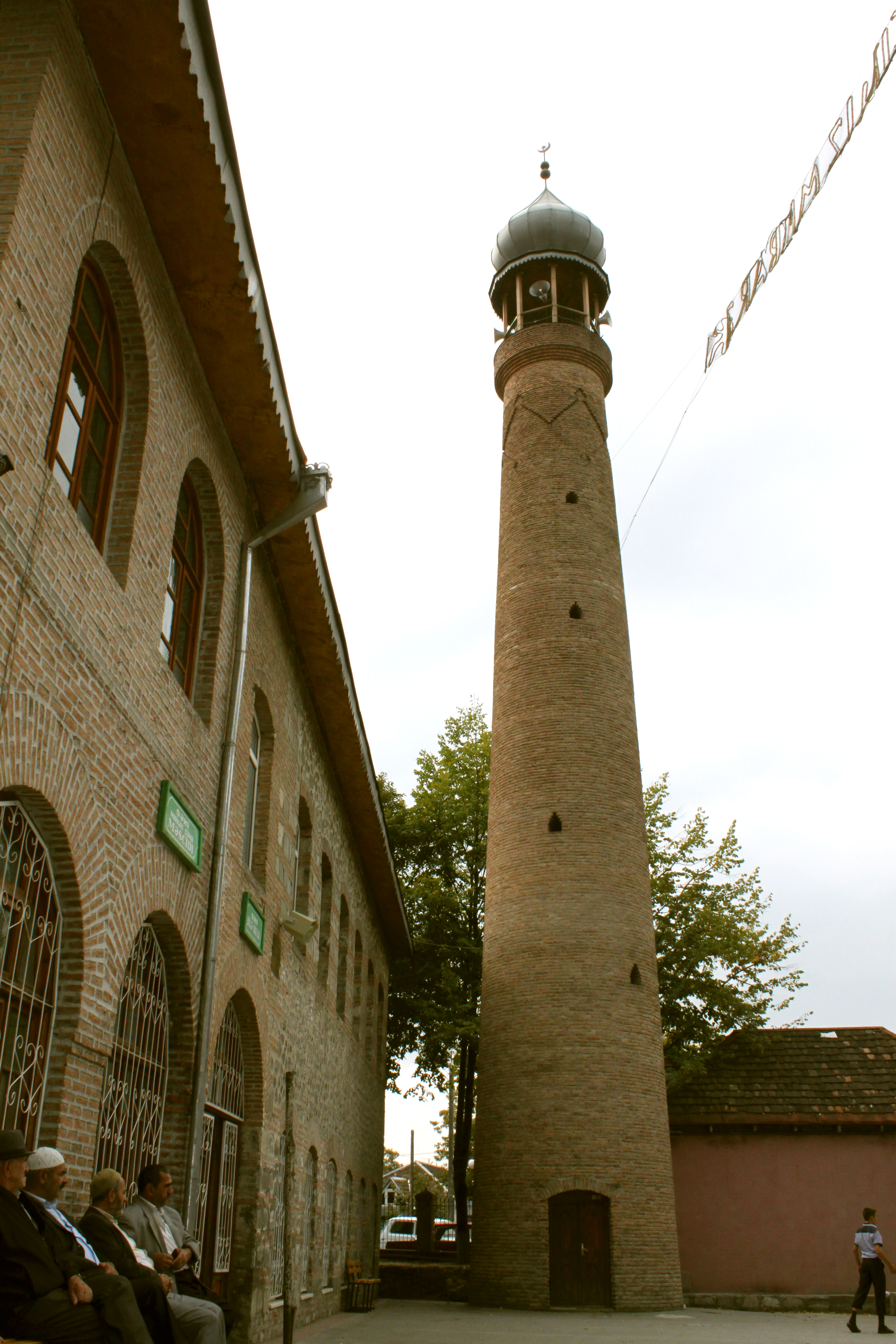
Minaret of Friday mosque

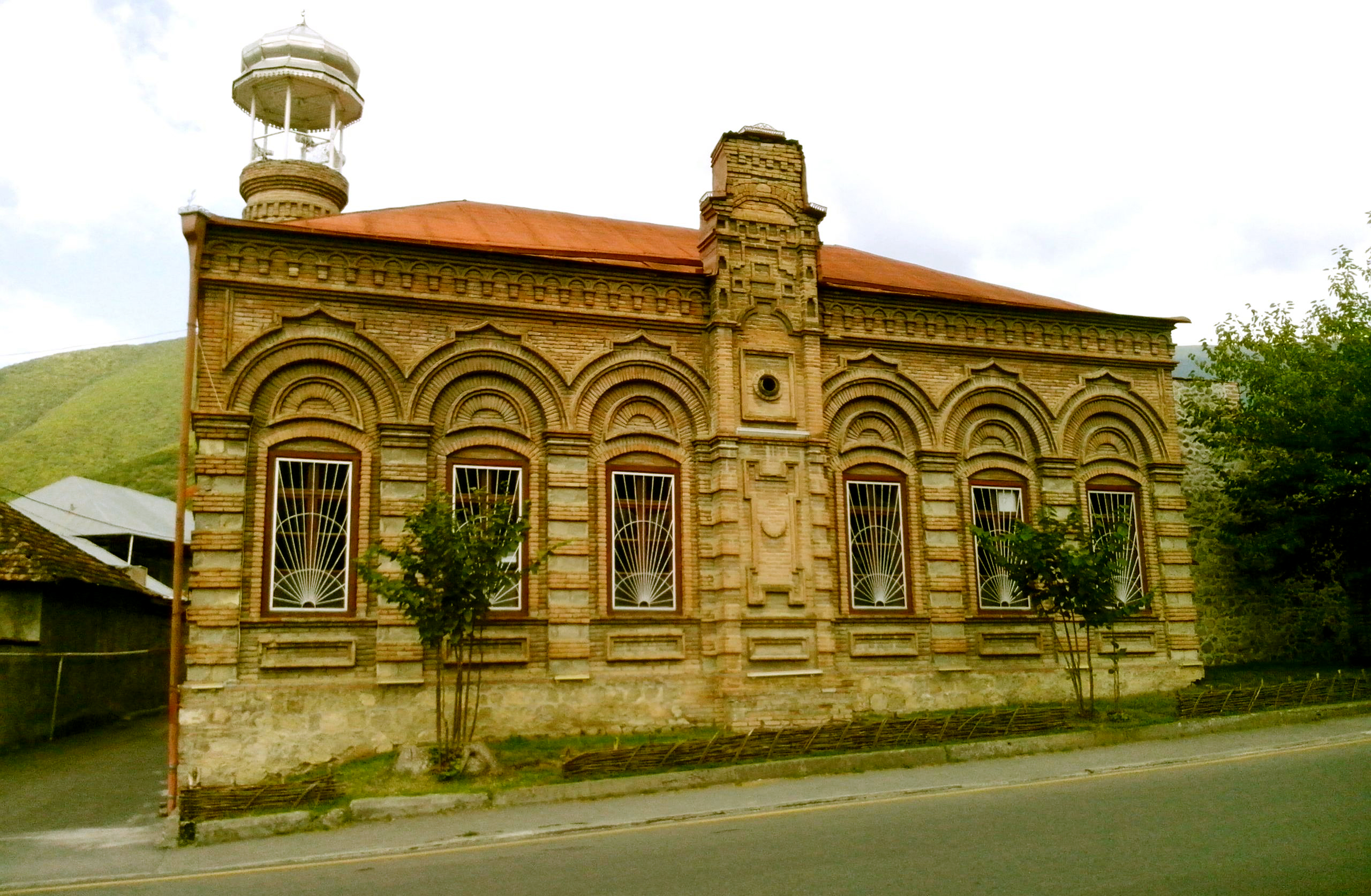
Ömər Əfəndi mosque

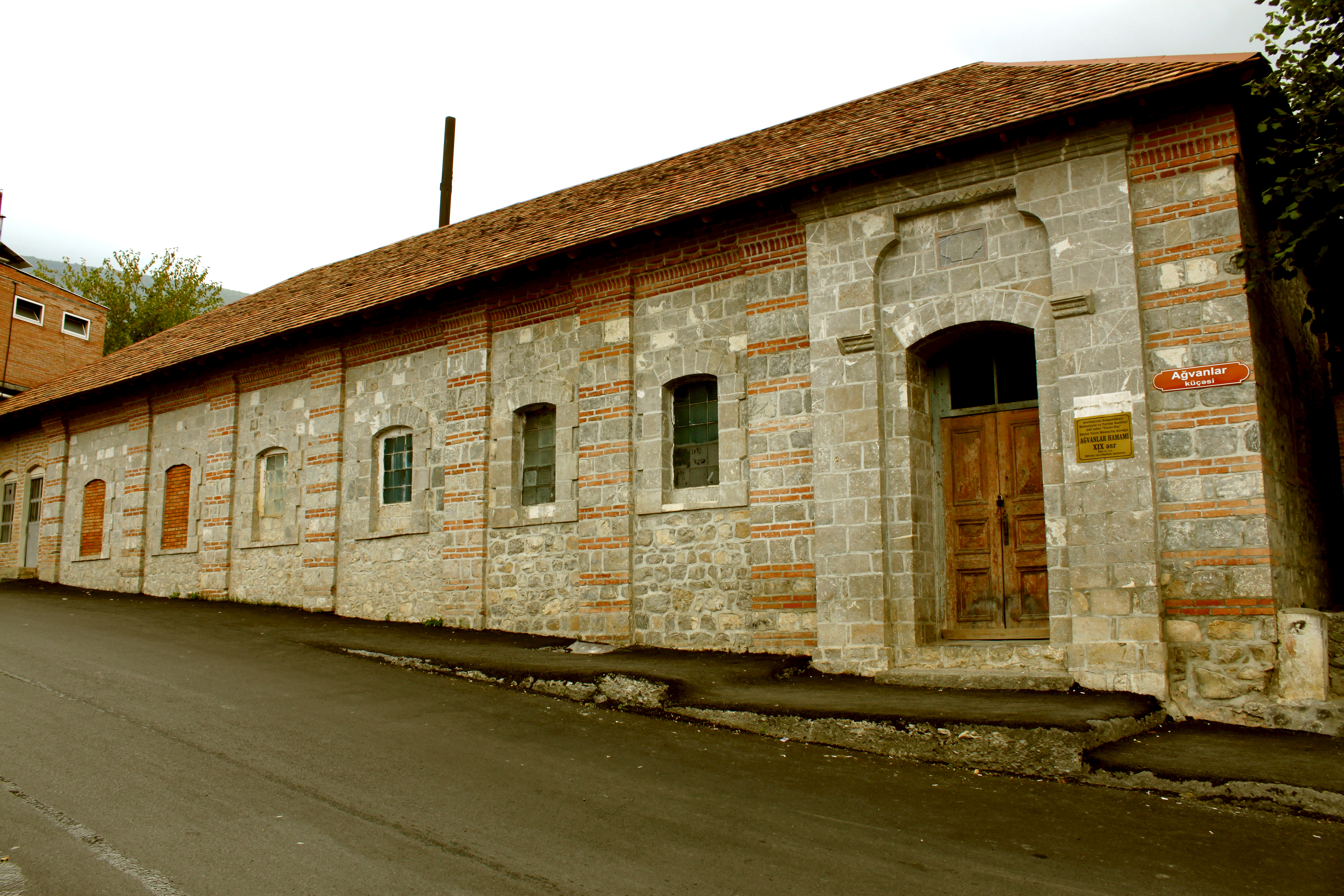
Ağvanlar bath

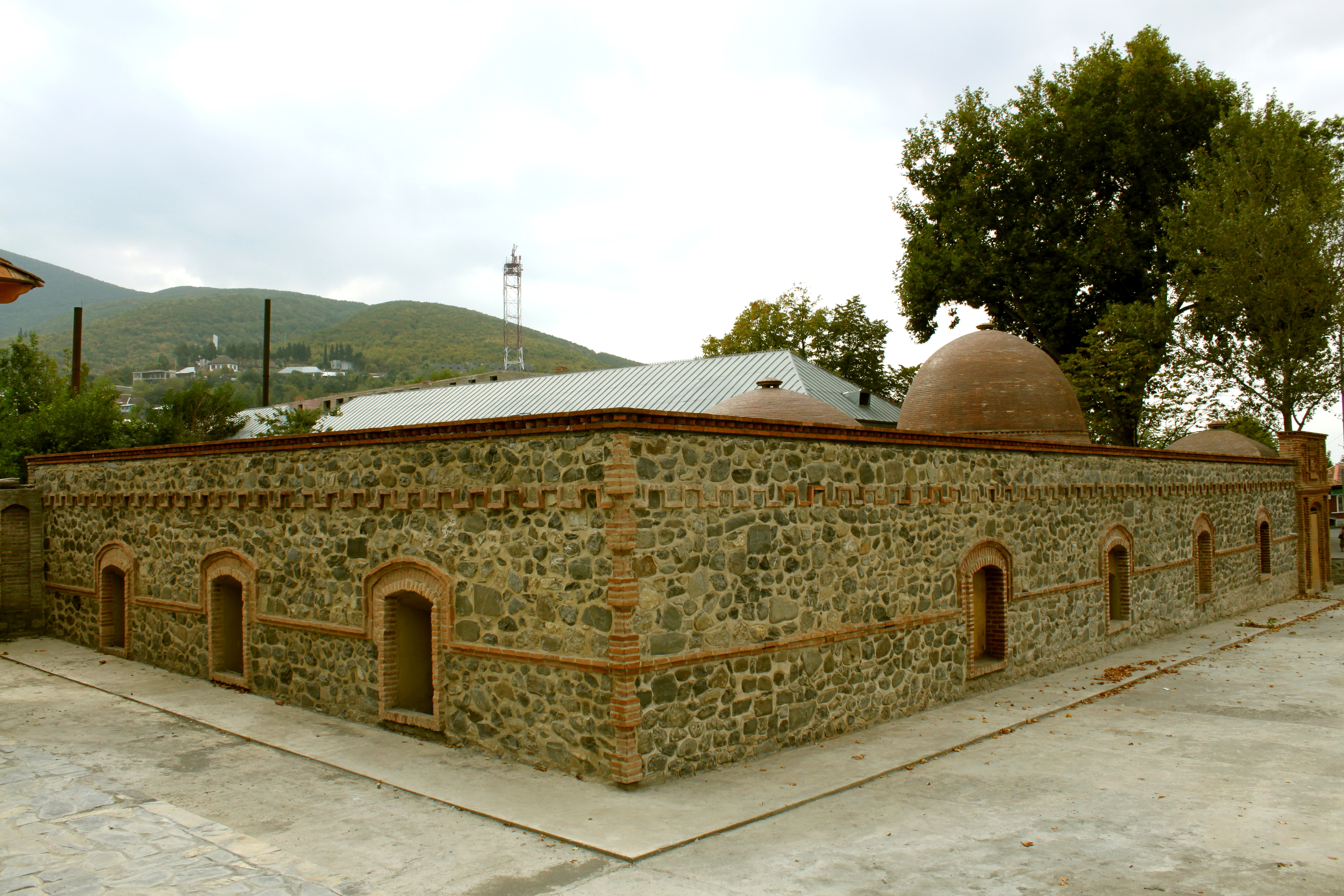
Undergraund bath in Shaki

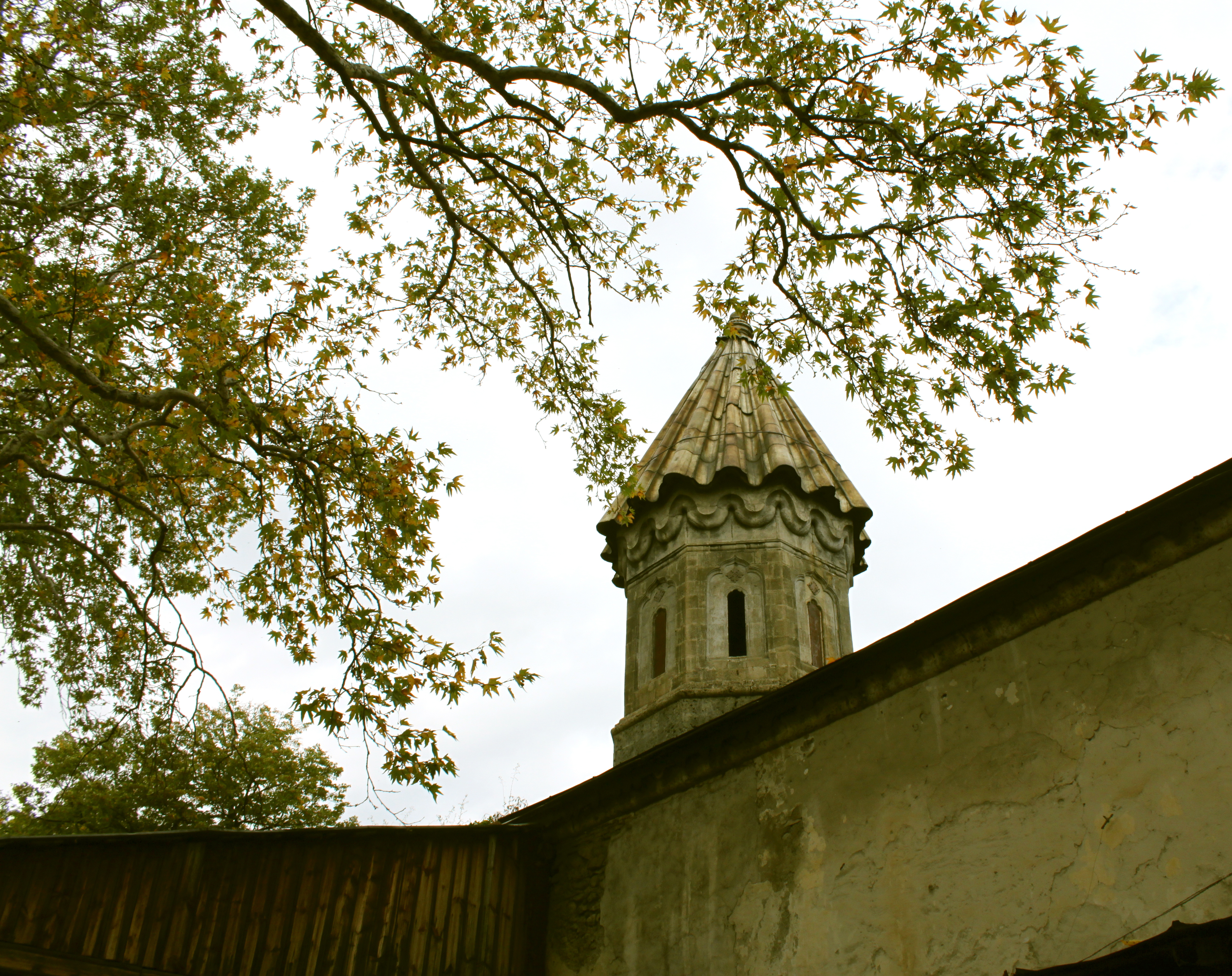
Former Armenian church in Shaki

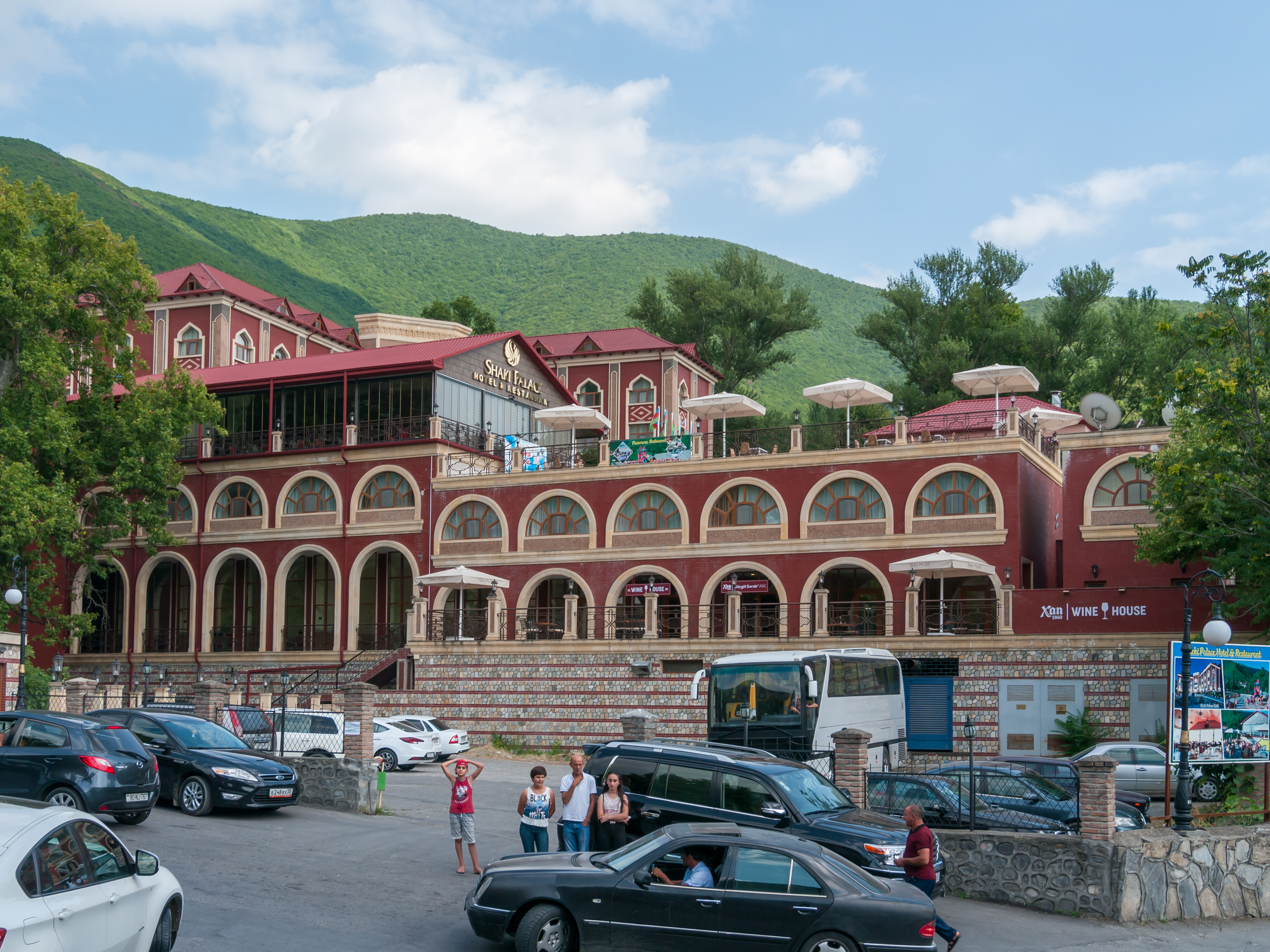
Palace Hotel, Sheki

== Twin towns – sister cities ==
Shaki is twinned with:

- Gabrovo, Bulgaria
- Giresun, Turkey
- Göynük, Turkey
- Lapseki, Turkey
- Meram, Turkey
- Slutsk, Belarus
- (Georgia (country)) Telavi, Georgia

== Also ==
Ağvanlar bath
