= Ağvanlar bath =

19th-century Azerbaijani building

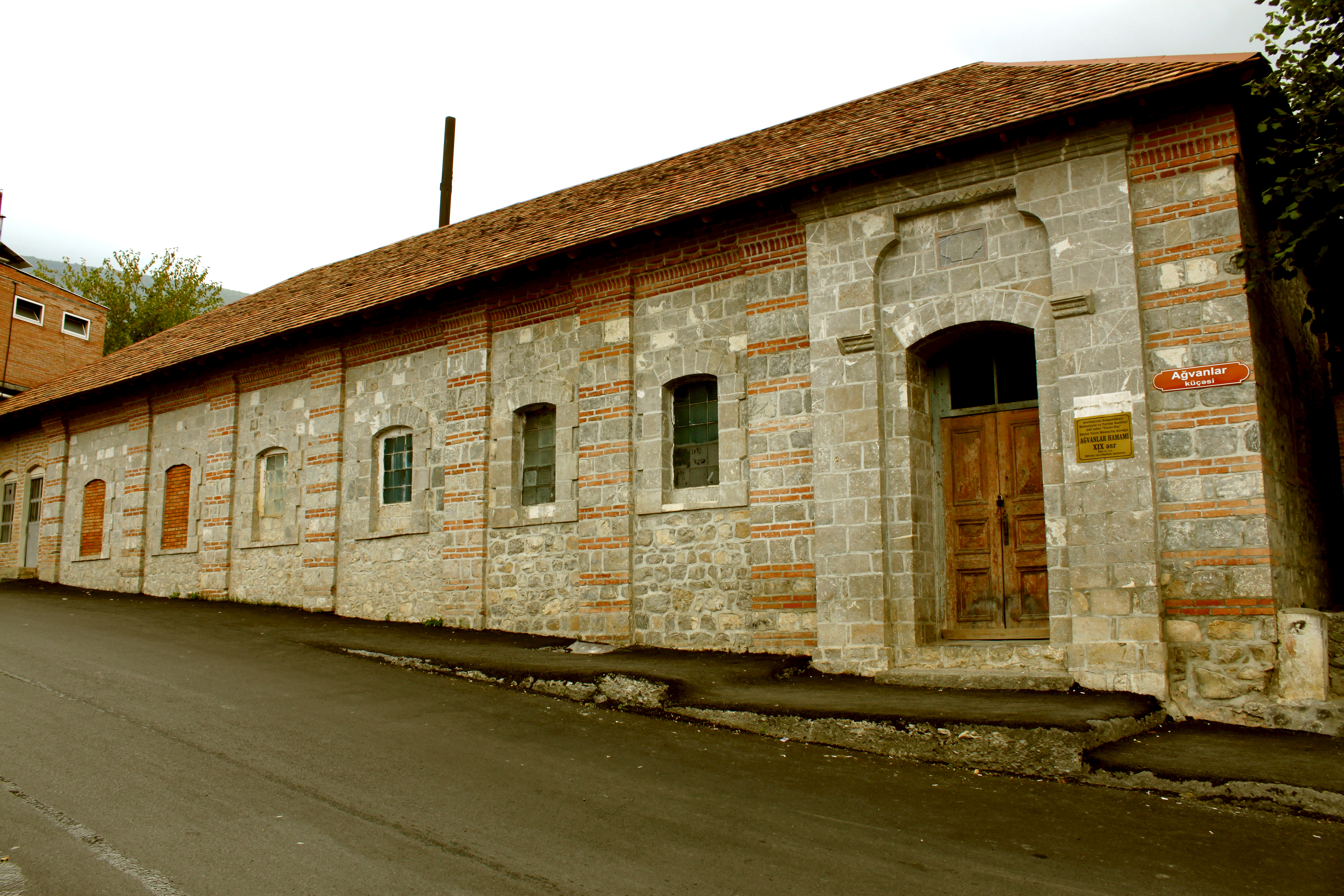
- Interactive map of Ağvanlar bath
- 41°12′02″N 47°11′22″E

Ağvanlar bath is a monument built in Shaki, Azerbaijan in the 19th Century.

== Description ==
The bathhouse is located on the territory of the Upper Main State Historical and Architectural Reserve and is not used for its intended purpose. The name of the bathhouse Ağvanlar is associated with the name of the district. There is no exact information about who built the bathhouse.

By the decision of the Cabinet of Ministers of the Republic of Azerbaijan dated August 2, 2001, No. 132, the bathhouse was included in the list of immovable historical and cultural monuments of local significance.

Since 2001, the historical part of the city of Shaki has been selected as a candidate for inclusion in the UNESCO World Heritage List. On July 7, 2019, "the historic center of Shaki together with the Khan's Palace" was included in the UNESCO World Heritage List. This decision was made at the 43rd session of the UNESCO World Heritage Committee, held at the Baku Congress Center. Ağvanlar Bath, located in the historical center of Shaki, is also part of the World Heritage Site.
