= Qishlaq Bath =

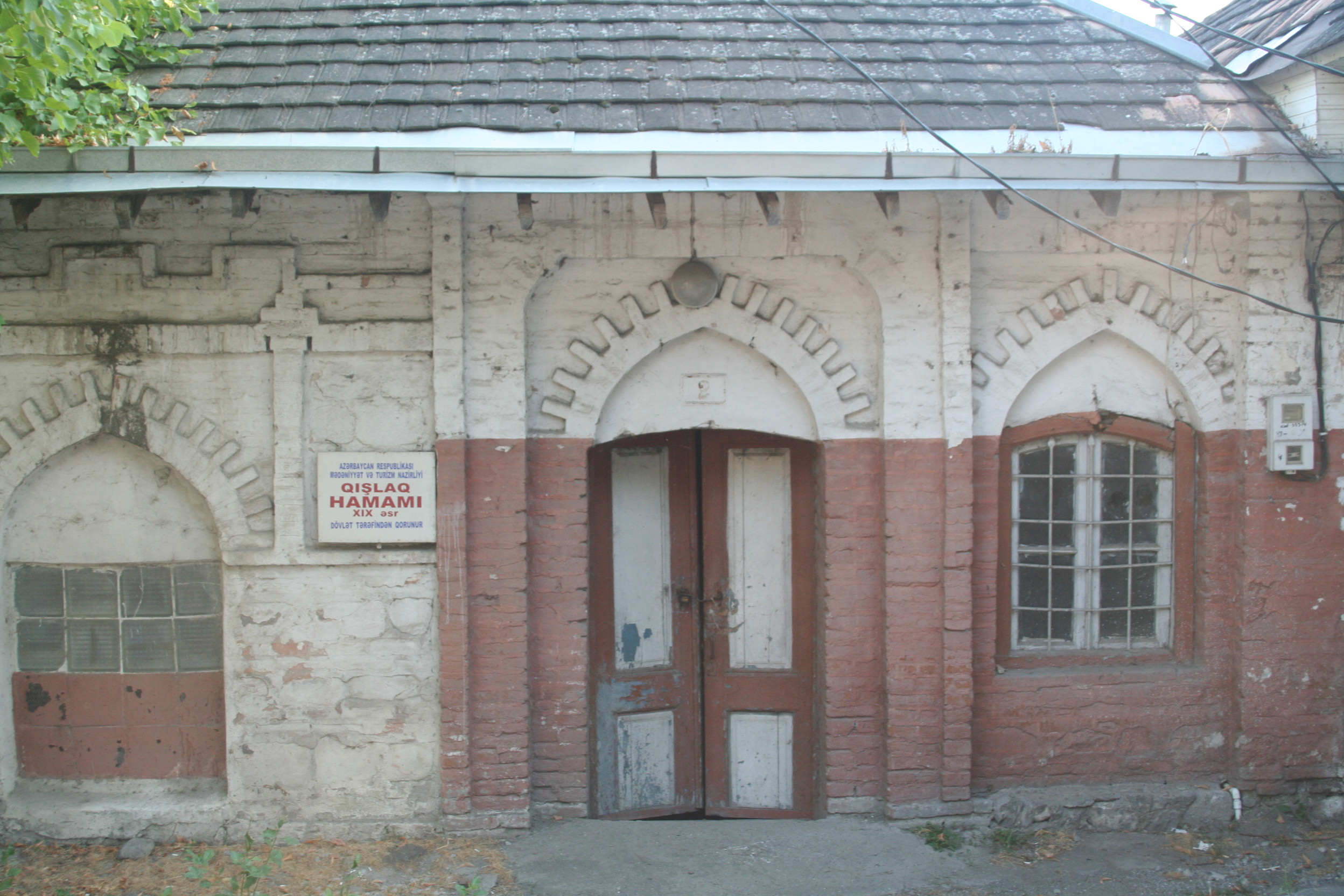
- Location: M.A. Rasulzadeh Street, 65
- Coordinates: 41.1873°N 47.1713°E
- Area: Shaki, Azerbaijan
- Built: 19th century

Qishlaq Bath— a historical-architectural monument from the 19th century located in the city of Shaki.

The bath was included in the list of immovable historical and cultural monuments of local importance by Decision No. 132 of the Cabinet of Azerbaijan dated August 2, 2001.

== History ==
In the 19th century, there was no bathhouse in the Qishlaq neighborhood of Shaki, so residents had to go to the upper quarters of the city to bathe. To eliminate this difficulty, a local resident named Haji Gani Abdurrakhim oglu built a hammam in the neighborhood. He received financial support for the construction from his father-in-law, Zakariya, nicknamed "Pullu Zəkər" (Wealthy Zakar). Gani Abdurrakhim oglu also personally took part in the construction of the bathhouse. After its completion, for the first two months, visitors were provided with bathing supplies free of charge.

The bathhouse was included in the list of immovable historical and cultural monuments of local importance by Decision No. 132 of the Cabinet of Azerbaijan dated August 2, 2001.
