= Elkhan Usubov =

Azerbaijani politician (born 1960)

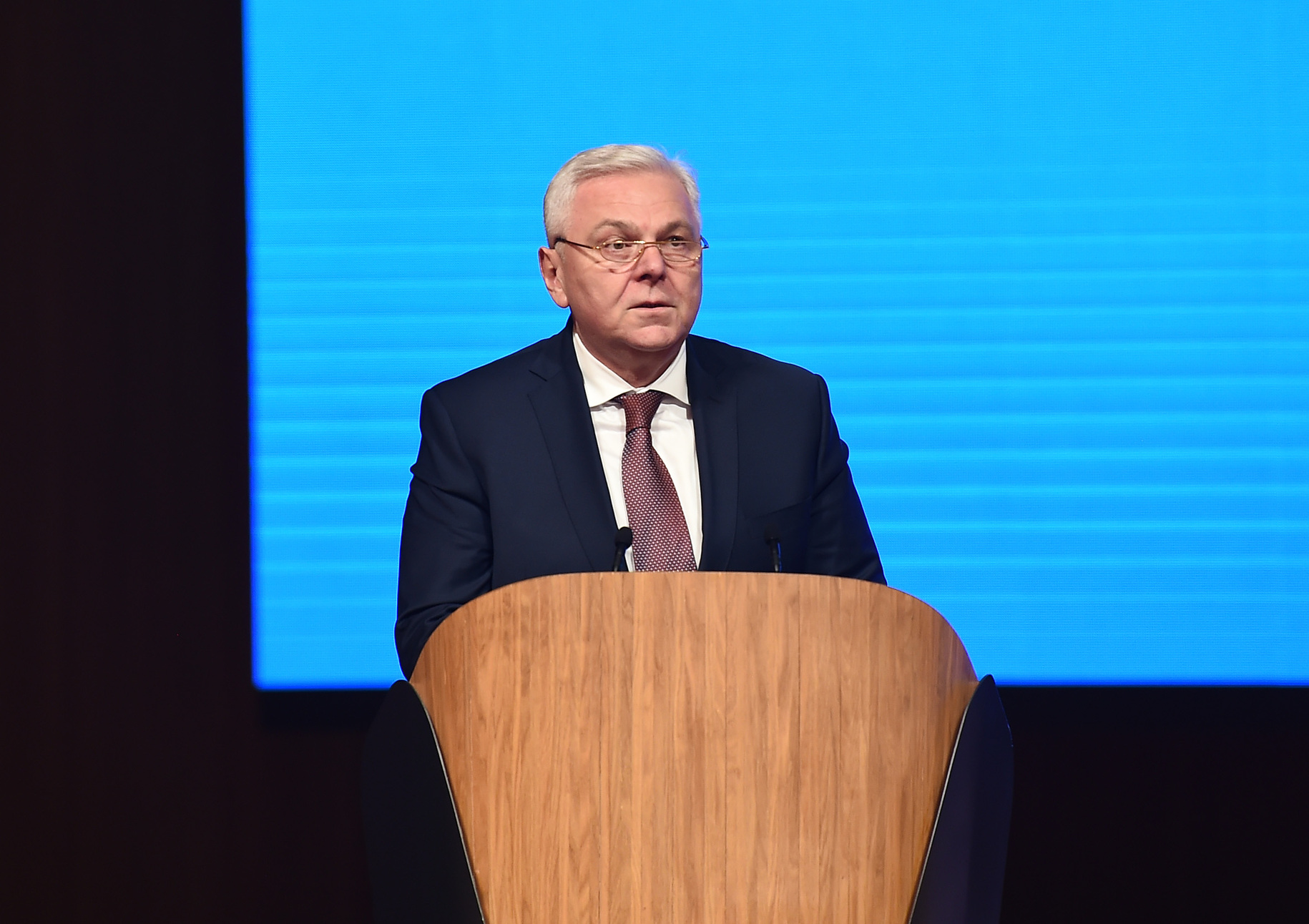

Head of the Executive Authority of Shaki
- Incumbent
- Assumed office 23 May 2011
- Preceded by: Murad Jabbarli

Head of the Executive Authority of Aghstafa District
- In office December 2007 – 23 May 2011
- Preceded by: Jumshud Musayev
- Succeeded by: Maharram Guliyev

Personal details
- Born: 26 May 1960 (age 66)

Elkhan Zabir oghlu Usubov (Elxan Zabir oğlu Usubov; 26 May 1960, Mingachevir, Azerbaijan SSR) is an Azerbaijani official and politician who has served as Head of the Executive Authority of Shaki since 23 May 2011. He previously served as Head of the Executive Authority of Aghstafa District from December 2007 to 23 May 2011.

== Early life and education ==
Elkhan Usubov was born on 26 May 1960 in Mingachevir, Azerbaijan SSR, Soviet Union. He received his secondary education in Mingachevir. He is qualified as an electrical engineer and economist. He has been credited with several technical and scientific proposals.

Usubov began his professional career in Shaki. He later engaged in business activities.

== Political career ==
From December 2007 to 23 May 2011, Usubov served as Head of the Executive Authority of Aghstafa District.

On 23 May 2011, by an order of the President of Azerbaijan, Usubov was appointed Head of the Executive Authority of Shaki.
