= Eight-sided minaret =

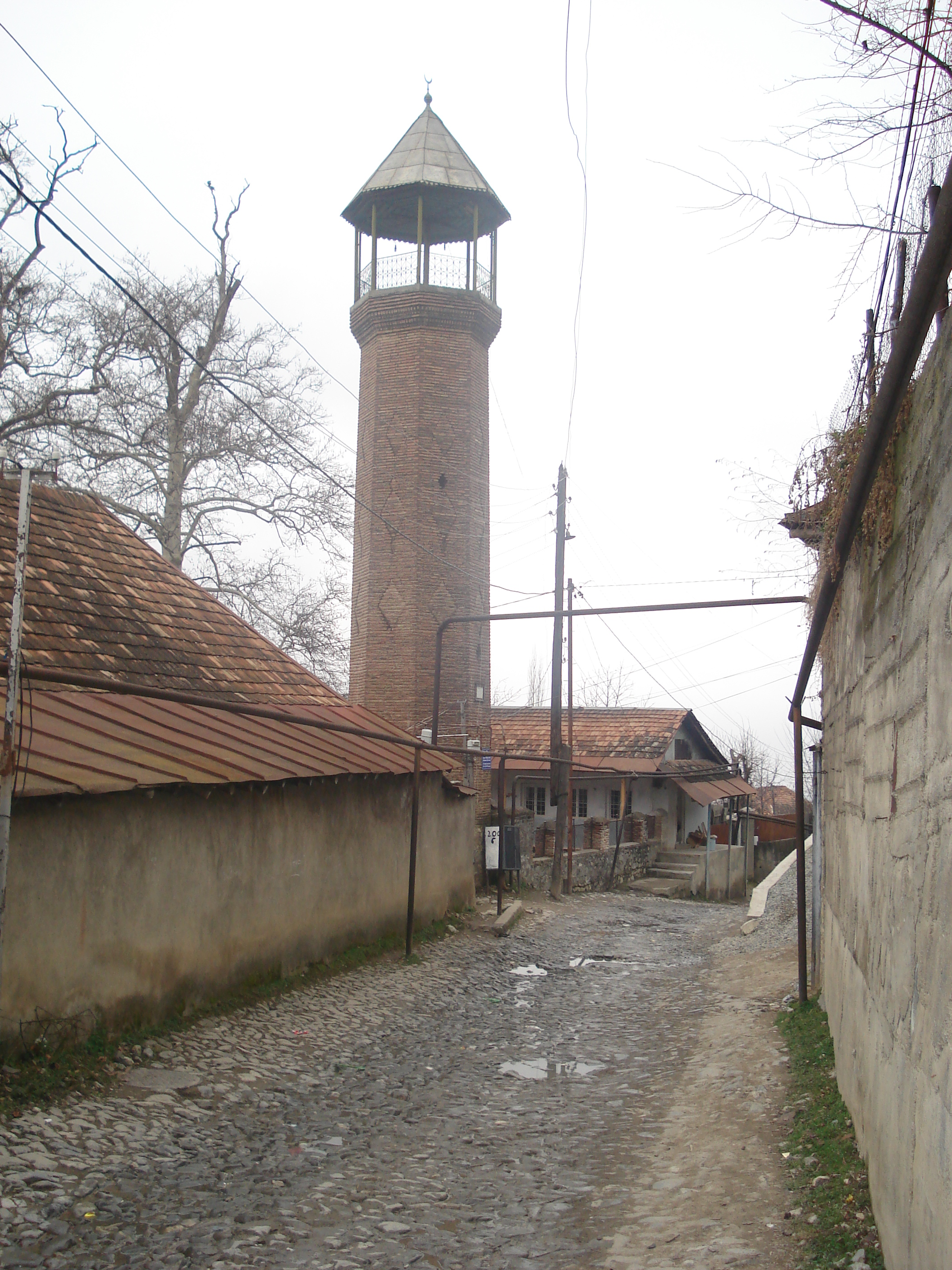
- Interactive map of Eight-sided minaret
- 41°12′17″N 47°12′17″E
- Location: Abdurrahim bey Hagverdiyev Street, 62

History
- Built: 1880s

Site notes
- Area: Shaki, Azerbaijan

The eight-sided minaret, a minaret built in the 1880s, is a historical and architectural monument located in the city of Shaki, Azerbaijan.

After the Soviet occupation, the mosque building was demolished, but the minaret was left untouched.

By Decision No. 132 of the Cabinet of Azerbaijan dated August 2, 2001, the minaret was included in the list of immovable historical and cultural monuments of local significance.

== About ==
The eight-sided minaret is located in the Yukhari Bash neighborhood of Shaki city, on Abdurrahim bey Hagverdiyev Street. According to assumptions, this minaret once belonged to the Juma Mosque that was situated in the area. An inscription on the minaret indicates that it was built in the 1880s. A tombstone adjacent to the minaret notes that the scholar Mustafa Efendi was buried there. The minaret itself is made of red brick, while the foundation of the demolished mosque building is made of river stone. The brick edges of the minaret are decorated with pressed rhombus patterns.

After the Soviet occupation in Azerbaijan, an official campaign against religion began in 1928. In December of that year, the Central Committee of the Communist Party of Azerbaijan transferred many mosques, churches, and synagogues to the control of clubs for use in educational purposes. While there were 3,000 mosques in Azerbaijan in 1917, this number dropped to 1,700 in 1927, to 1,369 in 1928, and to just 17 by 1933. During this period, the mosque in the area was destroyed, but the eight-sided minaret survived because it had been built separately from the mosque building. Today, only the foundation of the mosque building remains.

After Azerbaijan regained its independence, the eight-sided minaret was included in the list of immovable historical and cultural monuments of local significance by Decision No. 132 of the Cabinet of Azerbaijan dated August 2, 2001.

== Source ==
=== Literature ===
- Məmmədova, Gülçöhrə; Hacıyeva, Səbinə (2014). Azərbaycanın şimal-qərb regionunun memarlıq abidələri (in Azerbaijani). Bakı: Şərq-Qərb nəşriyyatı. p. 272.
