= Topgaraaghaj mosque =

Mosque in Shaki, Azerbaijan

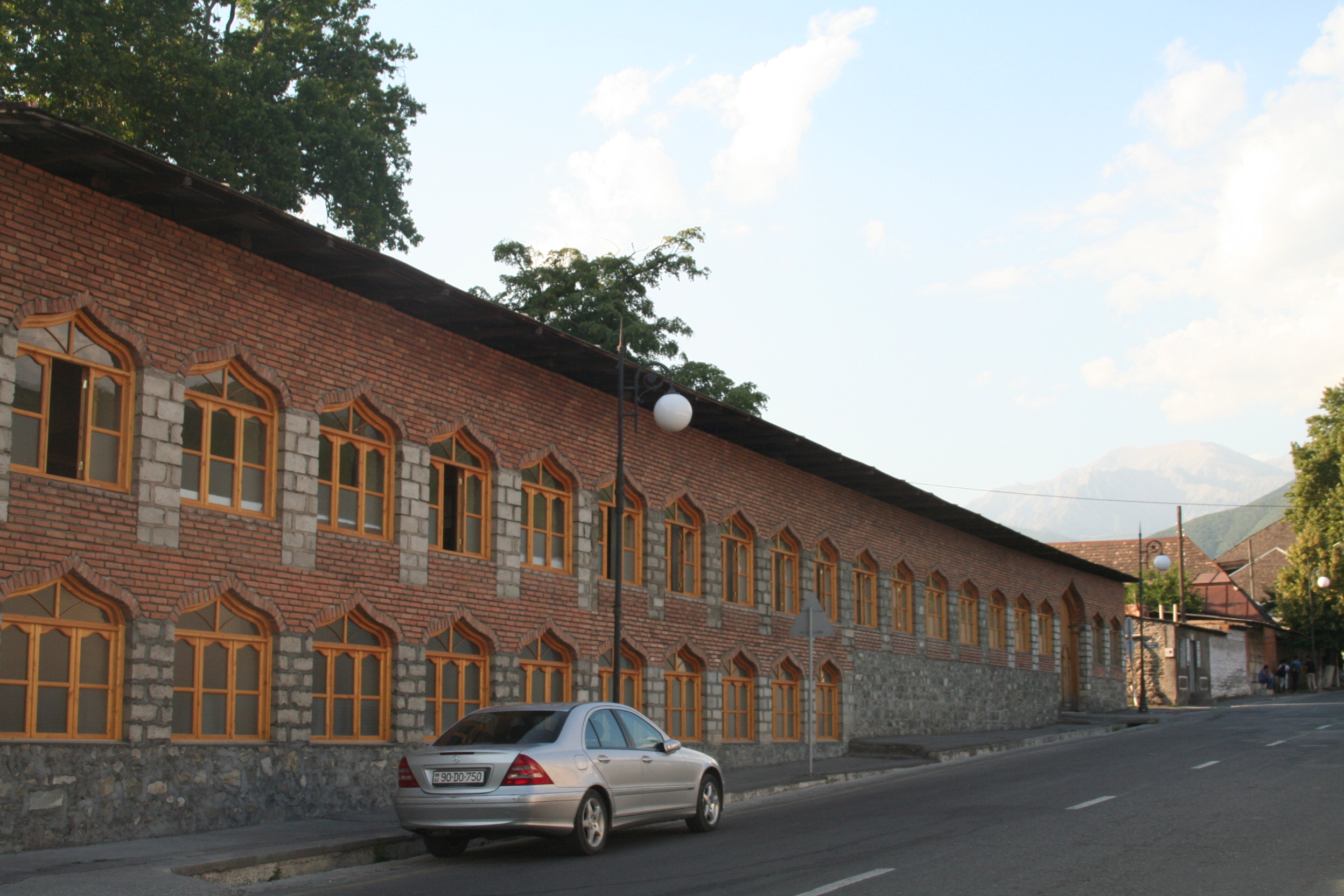
- Location: M.A. Rasulzadeh Street, 70
- Coordinates: 41.1871°N 47.1706°E
- Area: Shaki, Azerbaijan
- Built: 1899-1902

Topgaraaghaj mosque is a mosque built between 1899 and 1902 in the city of Shaki, Azerbaijan.

By Decision No. 132 of the Cabinet of Azerbaijan dated August 2, 2001, the minaret was included in the list of immovable historical and cultural monuments of local significance.

== About ==
Topgaraghaj Mosque was built between 1899 and 1902 in the Topgaraghaj neighborhood of Shaki city. Its interior area is 24 × 12 meters, and the veranda area is 24 × 4.5 meters. The mosque was constructed using baked brick and river stone.

After the Soviet occupation in Azerbaijan, an official campaign against religion began in 1928. In December of that year, the Central Committee of the Communist Party of Azerbaijan transferred many mosques, churches, and synagogues to the control of clubs for use in educational purposes. While there were 3,000 mosques in Azerbaijan in 1917, this number dropped to 1,700 in 1927, to 1,369 in 1928, and to just 17 by 1933. During this period, the Topgaraghaj Mosque was also closed for worship. The mosque building was used as a warehouse and sewing workshop.

After Azerbaijan regained its independence, both the mosque and a madrasa operating within it resumed activity. The mosque was included in the list of immovable historical and cultural monuments of local significance by Decision No. 132 of the Cabinet of Azerbaijan dated August 2, 2001. In 2018, the mosque was again closed for worship.
