= Mugham Festival =

Azerbaijani culture and music festival

The Mugam Festival or Shusha Festival is an annual cultural and musical festival held in Shaki, Azerbaijan. The festival features traditional Azerbaijani music known as mugam.

== Pioneers ==
One of the major pioneers of this festival was Uzeyir Hajibeyov who was a People's Artist of the USSR in 1938. Hajibeyov dedicated his life to preserve the traditional music of Azerbaijan. Another pioneer was Rashid Behbudov, also the winner of People's Artist of the USSR, who participated in every festival. The Mugham Festival was founded and is traditionally celebrated in the Azerbaijani city of Shusha. The last Mugham Festival in Shusha took place in 1988. Because of the conflict in the Karabakh region, Shusha has been occupied by Armenian forces since 1992 and all Azeris have fled the city. Today the festival lives on and has been held in Shaki since November 1994. Every year thousands of people participate in the festival.

== Children's festival ==
The Children's Mugham Festival, which is also held in Shaki, has emerged from the Mugham Festival. During the Children's Mugham Festival, many talented children, mainly refugees from the occupied regions of Azerbaijan, get the chance to share their music and sing to a large crowd.
