= Ituchan Waterfall =

- Interactive map of Ituchan Waterfall
- Location: Shaki District, Azerbaijan
- Watercourse: Shin River

Ituchan Waterfall (Azerbaijani: İtuçan şəlaləsi) is a waterfall in the Shaki District of the Republic of Azerbaijan.

== About ==
This waterfall, called Ituchan by the local population, is located at an altitude of 1299 m above sea level on the right bank of the Shin river. The main reason why the waterfall is called "Ituchan" by the local population is due to the fact that a shepherd dog fell and died from this road where the waterfall is located.

Ituchan waterfall, whose name is not mentioned in scientific sources, falling from a height of 14 meters. It is located on the historical Akhti-Shaki road. This natural monument was noted in 2023 during scientific research on the Shin River and its branches in the Sheki district in connection with the study of the ecotourism potential of the region by Elvin Garayev, researcher of the "Environmental Geography" department of the Sheki Regional Scientific Center of ANAS.

== See also ==
- List of waterfalls in Azerbaijan
- Meshebashi Waterfall
