= Khudger Waterfall =

- Interactive map of Khudger Waterfall
- Location: Shaki District, Azerbaijan
- Watercourse: Kish River

Khudgar waterfall (Azerbaijani:Xudgər şəlaləsi) is a waterfall in the Shaki District of the Republic of Azerbaijan.

== About ==
This waterfall, called Khudgar by the local population, is located at an altitude of 1668 m above sea level on the right bank of the Damarchin branch of the Kish river. The name Khudgar is derived from the words "khonkar", "khodkar" and "khudkar", which mean "ruler", "sultan" and "chief" in Azerbaijani. "Khudgar" waterfall, whose name is not mentioned in scientific sources, falling from a height of 14.8 meters and whose coordinates are 41°17′37″N 47°15′05″E, is a promising natural monument for the development of ecotourism in the region due to its uniqueness. This natural monument was noted in 2018 during scientific research on the Kish River and its branches in the Sheki district in connection with the study of the ecotourism potential of the region by Aghabalayev Qafqaz Mahammadhasan oglu, PhD in geography, the leading researcher of the "Environmental Geography" department of the Sheki Regional Scientific Center of ANAS, and by Rahimov Yusif Rasul oglu, the head of the "Environmental Geography" department.

== See also ==
- List of waterfalls in Azerbaijan
- Meshebashi Waterfall
- Ituchan Waterfall
