= Tepebaşı Necropolis =

Archaeological site in Shaki, Azerbaijan

- Interactive map of Tepebaşı Necropolis
- Type: necropolis
- Location: Fazıl, Azerbaijan

Site notes
- Area: Shaki District

Tepebaşı Necropolis is a burial monument of the Iron Age and Antiquity located in the Əyriçay in the village of Fazıl in the Shaki District of Azerbaijan. The monument, first recorded in 1984, plays the role of an important source reflecting the history of the Iron Age and Caucasian Albania.

== Geographical location ==
Tepebaşı Monument is located on a hill in the southern part of Fazıl village of Shaki district, 100–120 m west of the village of the same name. Tepebaşı is a horseshoe-shaped hill that extends from northeast to southwest, ends with Əyriçay in the southwest, and continues with the Great Plain on the east, northeast, and on the southern side. It borders on depressions, swamps, and Əyriçay in the east and southeast.

== Archaeological excavations in Tepebaşı ==
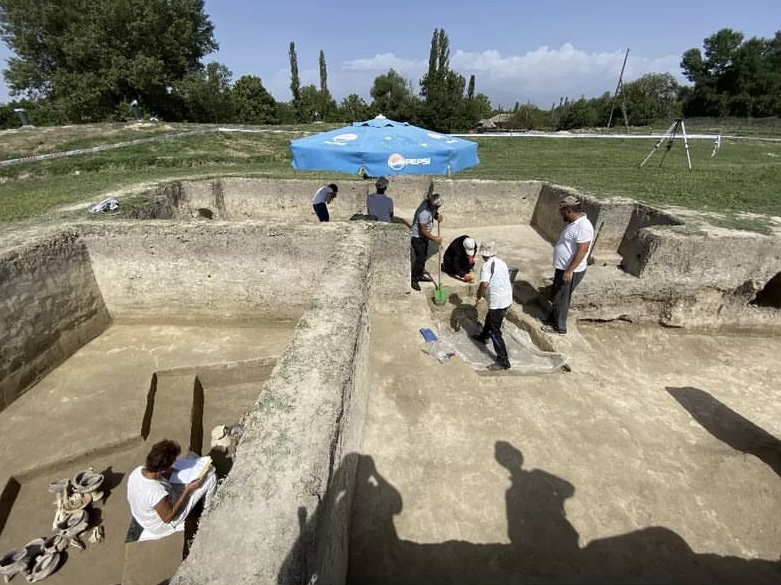
Archaeological research conducted at the Tepebaşı site

The Tepebaşı monument was first recorded by archaeologist Nasib Mukhtarov in 1984. Over the next 20 years, rescue and large-scale field research was carried out at the monument. Research has proven that the monument is a necropolis dating back to the Late Bronze Age – Iron Age and Antiquity. Long-term research has shown that the main burials at the Tepebaşı monument were in pits and earthen graves. The deceased were buried on their right or left side, partially curled up. In some graves, the deceased was not buried entirely, but only individual parts were buried in the grave. The direction of the graves is predominantly northwest. The depth of the graves varies from 45 to 165 cm.

The "rich" graves here are dug deeper and their depth is consistently recorded as 160 cm (63 in). The dimensions of such graves are also large: 200–360 cm (79–142 in) long and 120–180 cm (47–71 in) wide. The distance between the graves was small: 40–100 cm (16–39 in). Although no fireplaces were found in the graves, large and small pieces of coal and layers of ash can be found throughout the grave. Presumably, layers of ash and coal are sprinkled during the burial ritual. In 1996, employees of the Institute of Archeology and Ethnography of the National Academy of Sciences of Azerbaijan, operating in Shaki, created an underground labyrinth museum on the territory of the monument called "The World of Eternal Silence". The main feature of the museum is that the graves discovered during the study of the Tepebaşı monument are kept in their places and exhibited there.

In 2019–2020, archaeological research at the site was continued by the Shaki Archaeological Expedition, led by Dr. Zaur Gasanov and prominent Kazakhstani archaeologist Zainolly Samashev. The finds discovered during the excavations make it possible to trace the transition from one period to another – from the Iron Age to antiquity.
