= World of Eternal Silence (labyrinth museum) =

Archeological museum in Azerbaijan

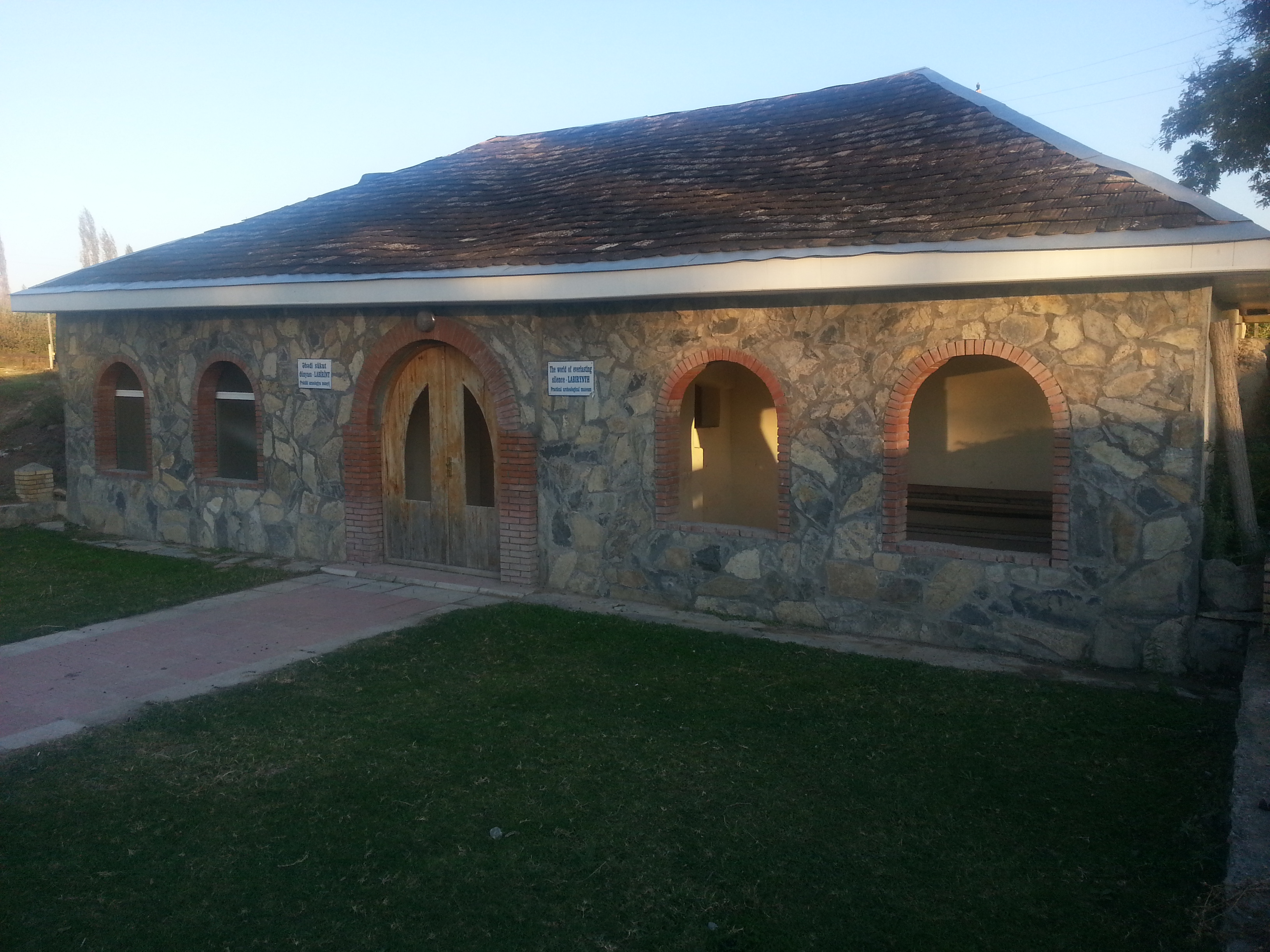
- Coordinates: 41°01′51″N 47°13′49″E

The labyrinth museum The World of Eternal Silence (Azerbaijani: Əbədi Sükut Dünyası Labirint Muzeyi) is an underground museum of practical archaeology located in the village of Fazil in the Shaki region. The museum provides protection and exhibits archaeological exhibits of the area where it is located.

== Location ==
The World of Eternal Silence Museum-Labyrinth is located 30 km from the city of Shaki in the Republic of Azerbaijan, in the village of Fazil, on the territory of the Tepebashi monument. The museum occupies an area of about 0.07 hectares in the middle of the Tepebashi monument.

== Creation ==
The World of Eternal Silence Museum-Labyrinth was created in March 2005 with the personal funds of the outstanding archaeologist Nasib Mukhtarov, an employee of the Institute of Archaeology and Ethnography of the National Academy of Sciences of Azerbaijan, who conducts archaeological research in Sheki. Nasib Mukhtarov supervised the field research carried out at the Tepebashi monument in 1984–2017. Some of the graves recorded as a result of the research have been preserved in the condition in which they were discovered and are exhibited inside the museum. The main feature of the museum is that the grave forms of the Tepebashi monument are preserved in place and are presented to visitors visually with all the details of the monument. The name of the museum as a labyrinth is due to the fact that its internal plan resembles a labyrinth.

== Exhibits ==
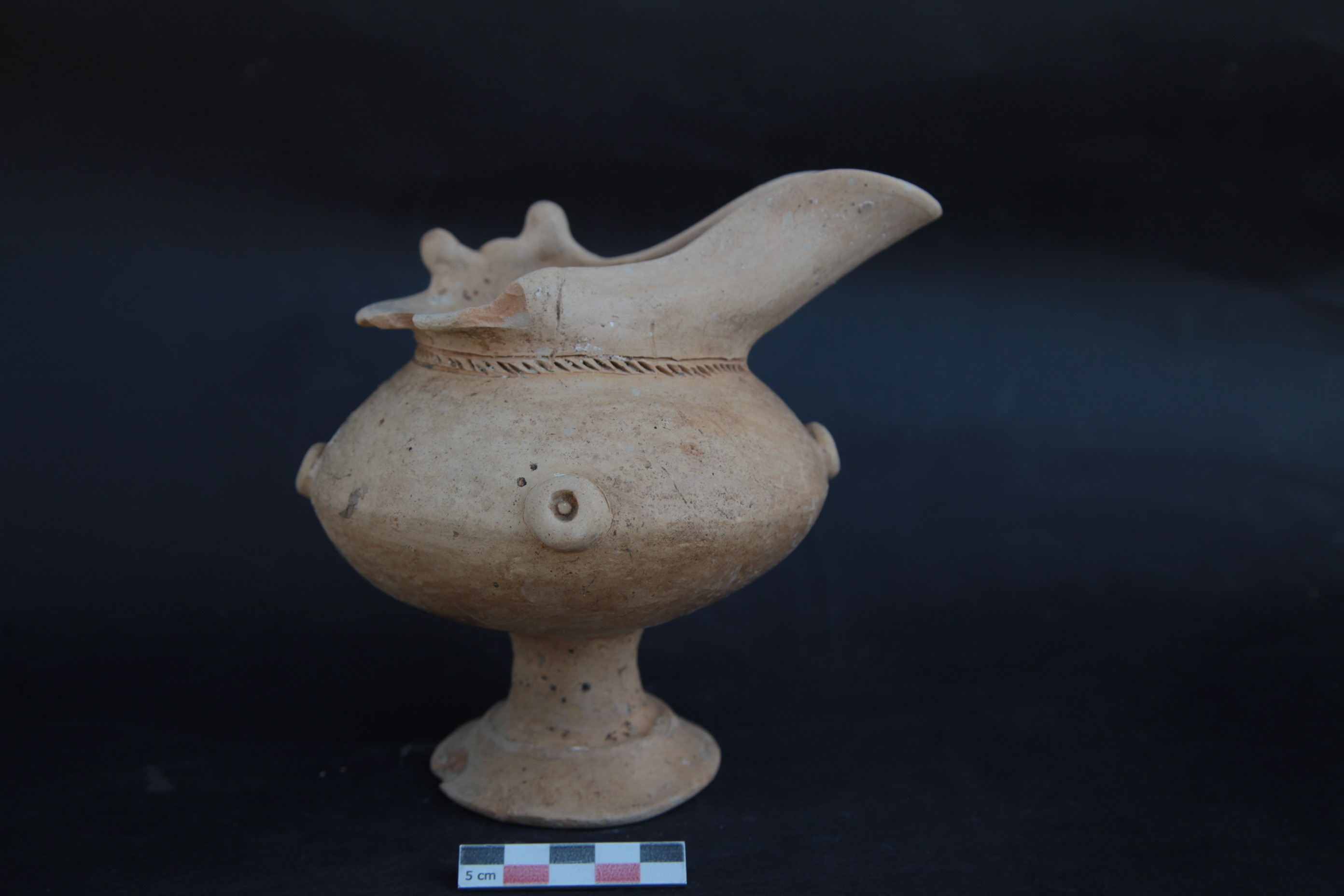

The Labyrinth Museum of the World of Eternal Silence contains 16 exhibits. The exhibits consist of earthen graves preserved in the form in which they were found and a farm well. The exhibits are located on the walls and in the corridor. The exhibits presented mainly relate to samples of the material culture of the Iron Age and ancient times. There are also artifacts in the exhibit, the shape of which dates back to the Late Bronze Age — Early Iron Age. These exhibits are mainly represented by ceramics. Some ceramics contain features that are not typical of the local culture. These vessels allow us to trace the trade relations of that period (Hellenic-Caucasian Albania). The exhibits contain samples of weapons of the Caucasian Albania type - spearheads, daggerheads, pointed and flat swords, metal and non-metal jewelry - necklaces, bracelets, pectoral jewelry, earrings, etc., as well as ceramic vessels for various purposes. Among them, three female idols are considered the main finds that attract attention. Another interesting find stored in the museum is the osteological remains. Birds, large and small horned animals, horses, pigs, fish, etc., and the associated bones create an image of hunting, fishing, and animal husbandry. The most common osteological remains here belong to extinct mountain cattle. These exhibits displayed in the museum are sources that form certain ideas about the socio-economic life, and religious and mythological worldview of the Iron Age and ancient times.
