= Baş Kəldək =

- Municipality
- Location within Azerbaijan Location within Shaki-Zagatala Economic Region
- Coordinates: 41°10′N 47°20′E
- Country: Azerbaijan
- Rayon: Shaki

Population
  - Total: 1,111
- Time zone: UTC+4 (AZT)
  - Summer (DST): UTC+5 (AZT)

Baş Kəldək (also, Bash Kel’dek) is a village and municipality in the Shaki Rayon of Azerbaijan. It has a population of 1,111. The municipality consists of the villages of Baş Kəldək and Aşağı Kəldək.
