= Aşağı Zəyzid =

- Location within Azerbaijan Location within Shaki-Zagatala Economic Region
- Coordinates: 41°05′35″N 47°12′35″E
- Country: Azerbaijan
- Rayon: Shaki
- Time zone: UTC+4 (AZT)
  - Summer (DST): UTC+5 (AZT)

Aşağı Zəyzid (also, Orta Zəyzit and Ashaga-Zəyzit) is a village in the Shaki Rayon of Azerbaijan.
