= Dərəcənnət =

Coordinates: 40°59′N 47°11′E

Dərəcənnət (also, Dərəcənnətli) is a village and municipality in the Shaki Rayon of Azerbaijan. It had a population of 879 as of 2009.
