= İbrahimkənd =

- Municipality
- Location within Azerbaijan Location within Shaki-Zagatala Economic Region
- Coordinates: 41°01′19″N 47°13′25″E
- Country: Azerbaijan
- Rayon: Shaki

Population
  - Total: 672
- Time zone: UTC+4 (AZT)
  - Summer (DST): UTC+5 (AZT)

İbrahimkənd (also, Ibragimkend) is a village and municipality in the Shaki Rayon of Azerbaijan. It has a population of 672.
