= Ahmadiyya Jabrayilov =

French resistance member (1920–1994)

- Əhmədiyyə Cəbrayılov
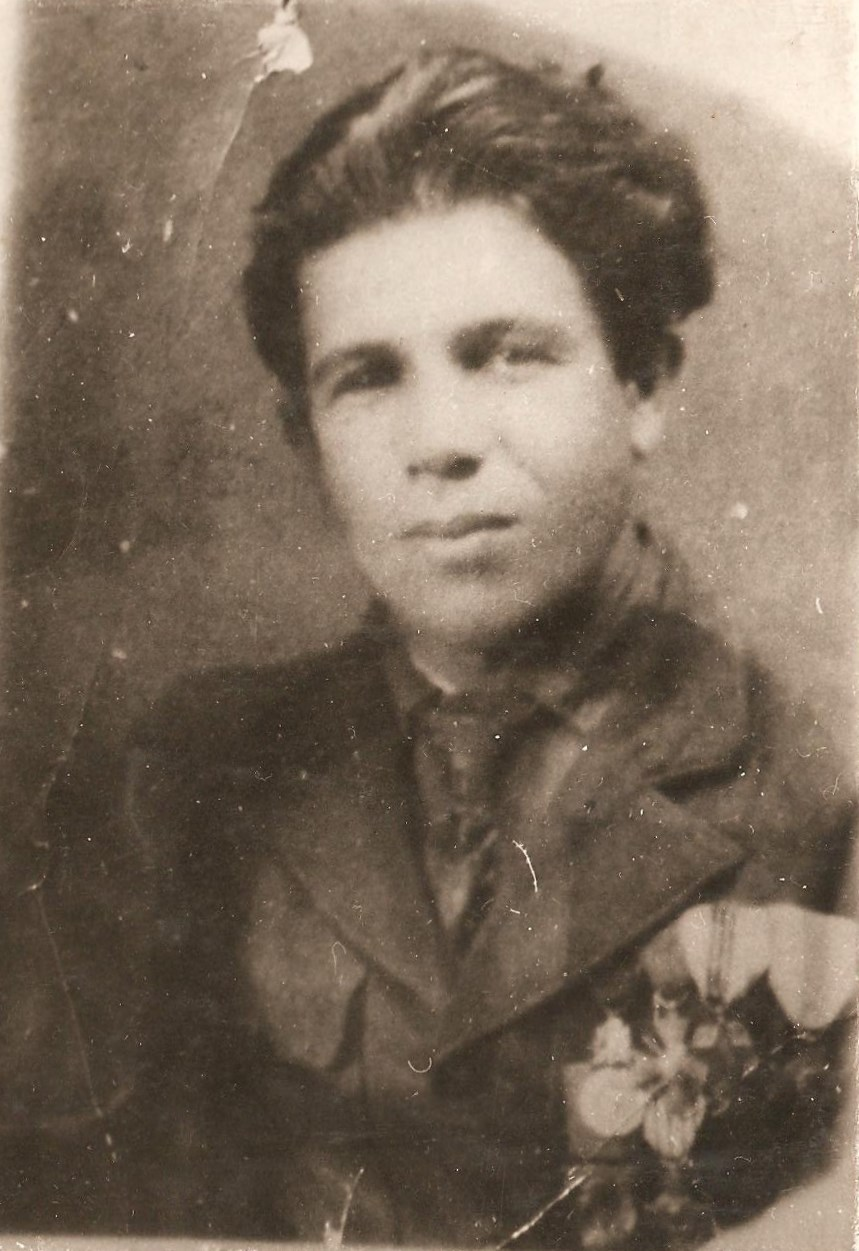
- Photo of Ahmadiyya Jabrayilov with his French medals (including Médaille militaire, Croix de Guerre, Medal for the War Wounded, Combatant's Cross and Croix des services militaires volontaires)
- Born: Akhmediya Mikhailovich Dzhabrailov; 22 September 1920; Oxud, Shaki Rayon, Azerbaijan SSR
- Died: 11 October 1994 (aged 74); Shaki, Azerbaijan
- Other names: Ahmed Michel, Akmed Michel, Kharko (Karko)
- Military career
- Allegiance: Soviet Union; France
- Branch: Partisans
- Service years: 1941–1945
- Rank: Lieutenant
- Commands: Reconnaissance and sabotage group (debatable)
- Awards: Médaille militaire, Croix de Guerre, Combatant's Cross, Insignia for the Military Wounded, Croix des services militaires volontaires (fact of decoration is debatable)

Ahmadiyya Mikayil oghlu Jabrayilov (Azerbaijani: Əhmədiyyə Mikayıl oğlu Cəbrayılov, Russian: Ахмедия Микаил оглы Джебраилов; French: Akmed Michel; 22 September 1920 – 11 October 1994) was a purported French Resistance member of Azerbaijani ethnicity. The factual existence of Jabrailov is in dispute, with allegations that his official wartime biography was entirely fabricated Soviet propaganda.

== Biography ==
Jabrayilov was reportedly born in Okhud village, Shaki District, Azerbaijani SSR, on 22 September 1920. In 1941, he began his service in the Soviet Army.

In 1960, the Soviet newspaper Nedelya (1960) published the following version of the biography of Jabrayilov by Soviet journalist Nikolay Paniyev and Azerbaijani historian Garash Madatov:

Wounded, Jabrayilov was taken hostage by the Germans. After several failed attempts, he managed to flee from the German camp. In August 1944, Jabrayilov was told by the leadership of the French Resistance to organize an escape from the camp of the town of Rodez that contained several thousands of Azerbaijanis. However, on 15 August a traitor exposed the plot to the Germans. While the plotters were being transported to the execution yard, several of them managed to escape. Later, the plotters joined the Soviet partisan regiment and formed a task unit that, together with the French patriots, liberated the town of Rodez from the German occupation. For his participation in the Resistance movement, Jabrayilov was awarded seven French medals.

The same author, Garash Madatov, in the book Azerbaijan in the Great Patriotic War, puts the biography of Jabrayilov in the following way:

Participated in the Resistance since its inception, liberated Paris from the Nazis and was awarded the highest French order. On 20 August 1944 at a rally in the liberated Paris [Paris was liberated on 25 August 1944] Jabrayilov delivered a speech on behalf of the Soviet soldiers.

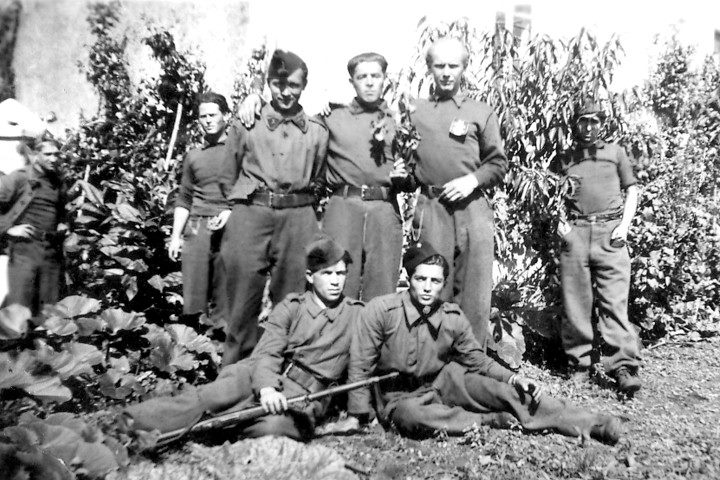
Ahmadiyya Jabrayilov (with rifle) with his comrades in France during the Second World War. Photo was published in the article about Jabrayilov in Bakinskiy rabochiy (1966). The original is in his house-museum in Shaki.

In the newspaper Bakinskiy Rabochiy (Baku Worker) of 1966, the biography of Jabrayilov is presented the following way:

Was taken hostage in the area of Kharkov-Izyum. Attempted to escape. Was placed in a camp near Lvov under the number 4167. Transiting through Germany he reached France. Several times tried to escape, was caught. In a camp in Toulouse, where he was again numbered 4167, a French cleaning woman Jeanne pitied Jabrayilov and persuaded the commandant of the camp to bury him in a decent way. A German doctor noticed that Jabrayilov was still alive, but allowed the funeral, hoping that he would die underground. Jabrayilov was buried alive in a coffin, at midnight French partisans dug up the coffin and pulled Jabrayilov out while he was still alive. Jeanne linked Jabrayilov with the Delplanque detachment (underground name of Dumas) [capitaine Gaston Delplanque organized the Resistance in canton Nègrepelisse], together with other soldiers of the detachment Jabrayilov participated in a number of combat operations, blew up trains and bridges, foiled the plans of sending the French to labor camps in Germany. In course of one of such combat operations Jabrayilov, disguised in German uniform, was wounded and fell to the Germans, who took him for one of their own and placed him in a hospital. Having regained consciousness, Jabrayilov escaped from the hospital. During the liberation of Bordeaux [liberated on 28 August 1944] Jabrayilov, within the Delplanque detachment, led a group that penetrated into the center of the city through the sewers and caused panic among the Germans. Later, together with the Delplanque detachment, Jabrayilov went to Paris, where he met with the leader of the Communist Party, Maurice Thorez, and addressed the French people at a rally. Maurice Thorez awarded Jabrayilov with the highest French decorations – the "War Cross" (Croix de Guerre), the "Medal for voluntary military service" and the "Military Medal", which, according to Thorez, enabled Jabrayilov to march at the parades ahead of the French generals. During the surrender of Germany Jabrayilov was in Paris, he then returned to his native Azerbaijan.

According to the article of Azerbaijani historian H. Mehtiyev (published in Ever Living Traditions in 1968), Jabrayilov fought in France within "the first Soviet partisan division". While he was with them, the division liberated Paris. In total, Jabrayilov was awarded 8 highest orders and medals of France.

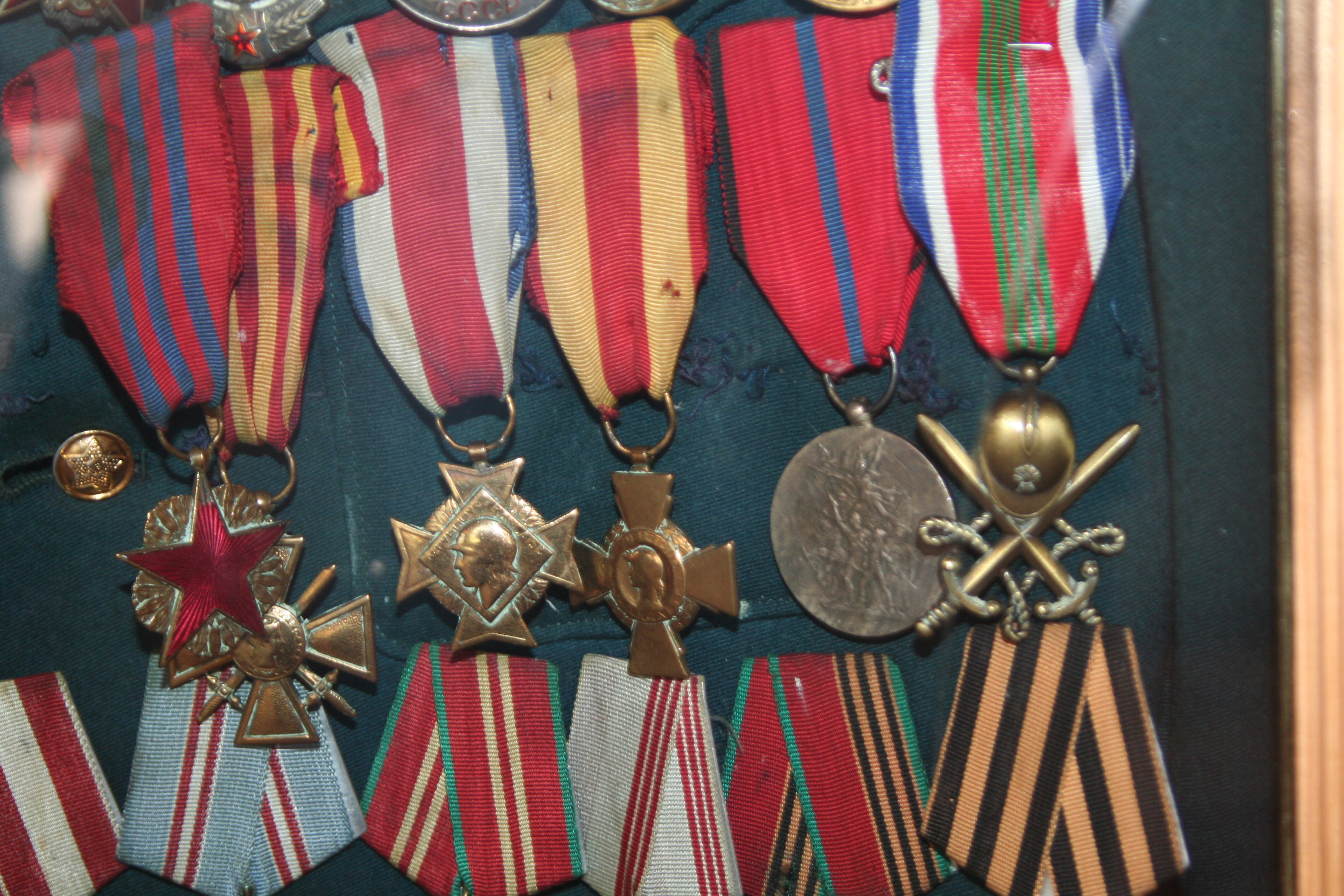
Awards of Jabrayilov in his house-museum in Shaki

In the book Against the Common Enemy (1972), Jabrayilov describes his own biography the following way:

In 1942 he was captured and in September 1942 was placed in a camp in the city of Montauban, where death-marked Jabrayilov was pitied by a French cleaning woman, Jeanne. She persuaded the commandant of the camp to bury Jabrayilov outside of the camp, however what was eventually buried was an empty coffin, while Jabrayilov was hiding in a haystack. Then, late [in the] fall of 1942, he joined the squad Delplanque in the Tarn-et-Garonne, as a member of which he was blowing up bridges and trains transporting the Germans and carrying out other daring combat operations. Jabrayilov's fame resounded throughout France. Being wounded, disguised in the German uniform, he was taken to a German hospital, but escaped shortly. In mid-August 1944 Jabrayilov was in Paris, where he participated in the liberation of the city. Was wounded. After the liberation of Paris [August 25, 1944] was eager to keep fighting, but the French insisted that he completes his treatment in a sanatorium. Upon his return to the squad after completing his treatment Jabrayilov with the Delplanque detachment participated in the liberation of Bordeaux [liberated on 28 August 1944], maneuvering through the sewers right to the town center and striking the Germans behind their lines. In September 1944, he participated in the liberation of Dijon [11 September 1944], blowing up ammunition and fuel depots on the outskirts of the city, while his friends stormed the city. Later, also with the Delplanque detachment, he fought near Colmar and Strasbourg. He then returned to Paris, where he met with Maurice Thorez. Was awarded five medals, "War Cross" (Croix de Guerre), "Cross for bravery", "Insignia for the Military Wounded", "Partisan Medal" and the "Medal for personal bravery in combat".

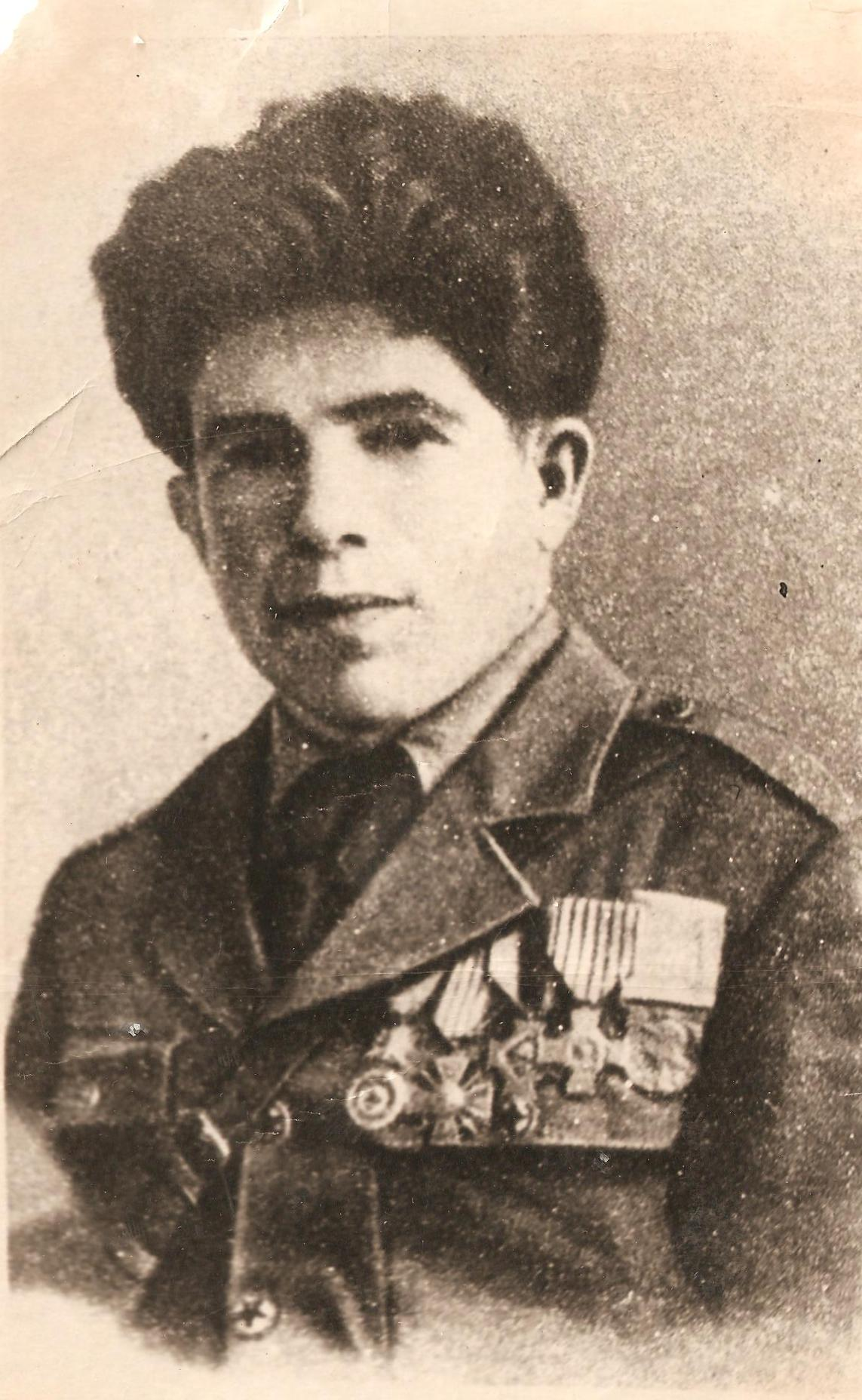
Photo of Jabrayilov published in Nedelya (1960). The original is in his house-museum in Shaki.

According to the captain B. Karpov (Soviet Military Review, 1975), Jabrayilov was placed in a camp near Montauban under the number 4167. A French woman, Jeanne, saved dying Jabrayilov by burying an empty coffin instead of his body. Jabrayilov joined the French partisans, with whom he carried out numerous dangerous combat operations. With the "Poppies squad" he liberated the city of Toulon, making his way through the sewers to the center of the city and striking behind the lines of the enemy. Jabrayilov also took part in the liberation of Lyon, Marseille, Toulouse and Paris. In 1945, Maurice Thorez invited Jabrayilov to his home and awarded him with orders and medals on behalf of the French government.

According to the French newspaper «Sud Ouest» (1975), maqui Jabrayilov was saved from a prison in Montauban while he was the prisoner of the Germans during the war. Later with the maquis of the region, he had to participate in the liberation of Montauban, Toulouse and Rodez.

According to the Azerbaijani Soviet Encyclopedia, Jabrayilov was captured in May 1942 in course of the battle for Donbas, and was kept in Dachau and Alsace-Lorraine concentration camps. In November 1942, he fled to join the partisans in France, took part in battles for the liberation of France, received several French awards (including Médaille militaire for personal bravery) and was retired in 1946.

In the newspaper, Bakinskiy Rabochiy (Baku Worker), Ms. Rugiya Aliyeva, an Azerbaijani journalist and author of the book Azerbaijanis in the European Movement of Resistance, tells the following story of Jabrayilov's life:

In 1942, he was taken hostage near Izyum. In 1943 he was sent to a camp in the town of Rodez together with other Azerbaijani prisoners of war. In the camp Jabrayilov was numbered 4167 and stayed there until at least the beginning of 1944. Dying Jabrayilov was saved by a French woman named Jeanne, who persuaded a carpenter to pierce holes in Jabrayilov's coffin so that the air could go through. At night, the partisans pulled Jabrayilov out of the coffin. Together with the guerrillas, Jabrayilov accomplished unique feats, he was declared wanted and the Germans pledged a reward of 10,000 ℛ︁ℳ︁ and two vehicles for his head. Maurice Thorez gifted Jabrayilov a custom engraved gun. When Jabrayilov's fame reached the Resistance leadership, Charles de Gaulle expressed a wish to meet with Jabrayilov. Their meeting took place on the outskirts of Tarbes, where de Gaulle instructed Jabrayilov to perform a series of complex combat operations, which Jabrayilov carried out flawlessly. After the liberation of Paris de Gaulle invited Jabrayilov to a banquet to celebrate the liberation of the French capital. At that banquet Jabrayilov was seated directly to the right of Charles de Gaulle. Jabrayilov was awarded the title of the "National Hero of France" and the Legion of Honor, which allows him to march at the parades ahead of the French generals. When Jabrayilov decided to return to the Soviet Union his wife Sarah refused to and she also kept in France their two children, Michael and Ali. During his visit to the USSR in 1966, de Gaulle wanted to visit Jabrayilov's home in his village of Sheki, but the Soviet leadership decided to send Ahmadiyya to Moscow instead. In the Sheremetyevo airport de Gaulle saw Jabrayilov, breaching diplomatic protocol he embraced Ahmadiyya and invited him to his Moscow residence. De Gaulle offered Jabrayilov property in France and cars as a gift, but Ahmadiyya rejected the kind offer. In November 1990, the French Senate invited Jabrayilov to France to take part in the celebration of the 100th anniversary of Charles de Gaulle.

According to Rossiyskaya Gazeta, de Gaulle met with Jabrayilov three times. Arriving in Moscow in 1966, de Gaulle included a meeting with Jabrayilov in his agenda. Jabrayilov was awarded the title of the "National Hero of France". He was also awarded the Legion of Honour and a number of other French decorations, including the Cross for Military Valour, which entitled him to march in parades ahead of the French generals.

According to the Translation Centre of the Cabinet of Ministers of Azerbaijan, Jabrayilov was a prisoner of war numbered 4167 and was placed in the camp near Marseille, which he fled to join French guerillas. In course of one of the combat operations, dressed in a German uniform, Jabrayilov was wounded and taken to a German hospital. Upon recovery, he was appointed commandant of the city of Albi, where he remained for eight months, gaining respect and credibility among his superiors and subordinates. Jabrayilov's actions to rescue prisoners of the concentration camps earned the admiration of de Gaulle. After the war, Jabrayilov, "one of the most respected members of the Union of Veterans of the Resistance" and "a legend of the Resistance", married a French woman, with whom he had two children, and worked in the office of Charles de Gaulle. In Dijon, an automobile factory was named after Jabrayilov. However, in 1951, Jabrayilov decided to return to the USSR. The United States offered "the famous reconnaissance man" US citizenship, France offered to gift Jabrayilov the factory named after him, but Jabrayilov rejected the offers. Upon his return to his native village, Okhud, he barely managed to avoid arrest and was forced to work as a shepherd. In France, a two-part film was made dedicated the life of Jabrayilov.

The version regarding his work as a commandant of the city of Albi can be also found in the material by Vugar Hasanov published on Vesti.az and in the encyclopedia Intelligence and Counterintelligence in the People.

Azerbaijani media representatives met with Javanshir Jabrayilov, the son of Ahmadiyya Jabrayilov, who heads the museum dedicated to his father's life. Javanshir related a story told by Ahmadiyya and his partisan friends. According to Jabrayilov's story, one day, during their walk in Paris, Charles de Gaulle and Jabrayilov were approached by a person in a hijab, and Jabrayilov hit that person. In response to de Gaulle's indignation as to how a Muslim could raise a hand on a Muslim woman, Jabrayilov tore the hijab off of that person revealing that it was actually not a Muslim woman, but a German officer disguised in a hijab. De Gaulle, saved by Jabrayilov, embraced Ahmadiyya and called him "his son".

According to Azerbaijani historian Ilgam Abbasov, who made a researches related to Azerbaijani partizans, Jabrayilov served at the 1st French Army till 13 March 1945. Archive documents prove that Jabrayilov fought valiantly at that period.

=== After the war ===
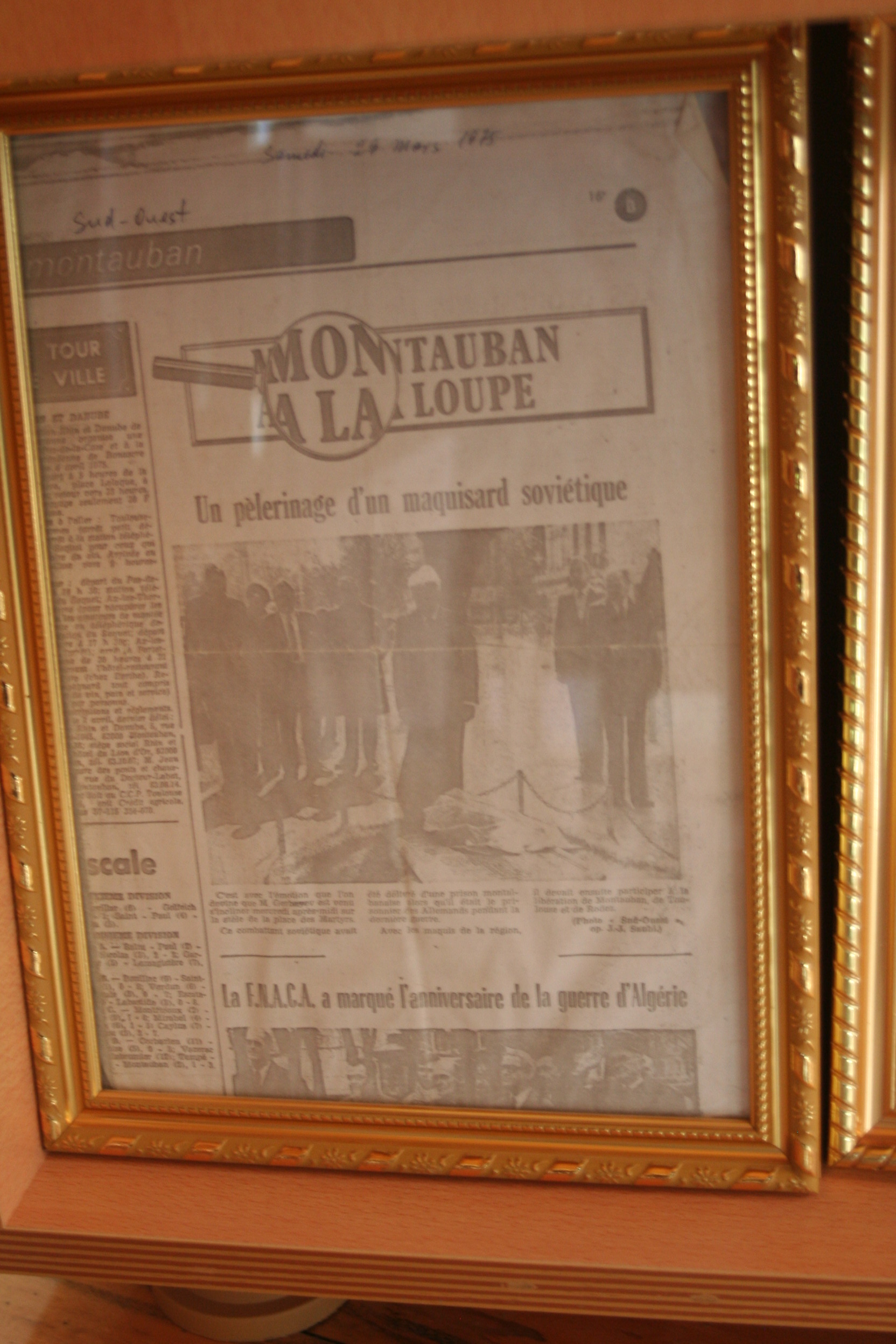
Article about Jabrayilov's visit to the memorial for martyrs of the war in France. Sud-Ouest newspaper, 1975. House-museum in Shaki.

From 1960, Jabrayilov was a member of the Communist Party of the Soviet Union.

In 1970, Jabrayilov graduated from Azerbaijan State Agricultural University, worked as an agronom at kolkhoz named after Nariman Narimanov in Shaki Rayon. Jabrayilov took part in the 29th and 30th Congresses of Communist Party of Azerbaijan.

According to Rugiya Aliyeva, in 1972, 1975, and 1980 Jabrayilov visited Rodez, Montauban, Toulouse, Albi and Paris, and met with his fighting comrades. In Paris, Jabrayilov was admitted by a member of the French Senate, Jacques Duclos, who gave him a memorable icon.

In 1985, Ahmadiyya Jabrayilov was awarded with the Order of the Patriotic War (second class). He also was awarded with the Order of the Red Banner of Labour, Order of the October Revolution and medals.

In 1990, a man claimed to be Ahmadiyya Jabrayilov's son, major of Militsiya (police) Mikayil Jabrayilov was killed in Nagorno-Karabakh and honored with the name of the National Hero of Azerbaijan.

Jabrayilov is said to have died in Shaki, Azerbaijan on 11 October 1994. The telephone box he was using was hit by a truck with failed brakes.

=== Criticism of biographies ===
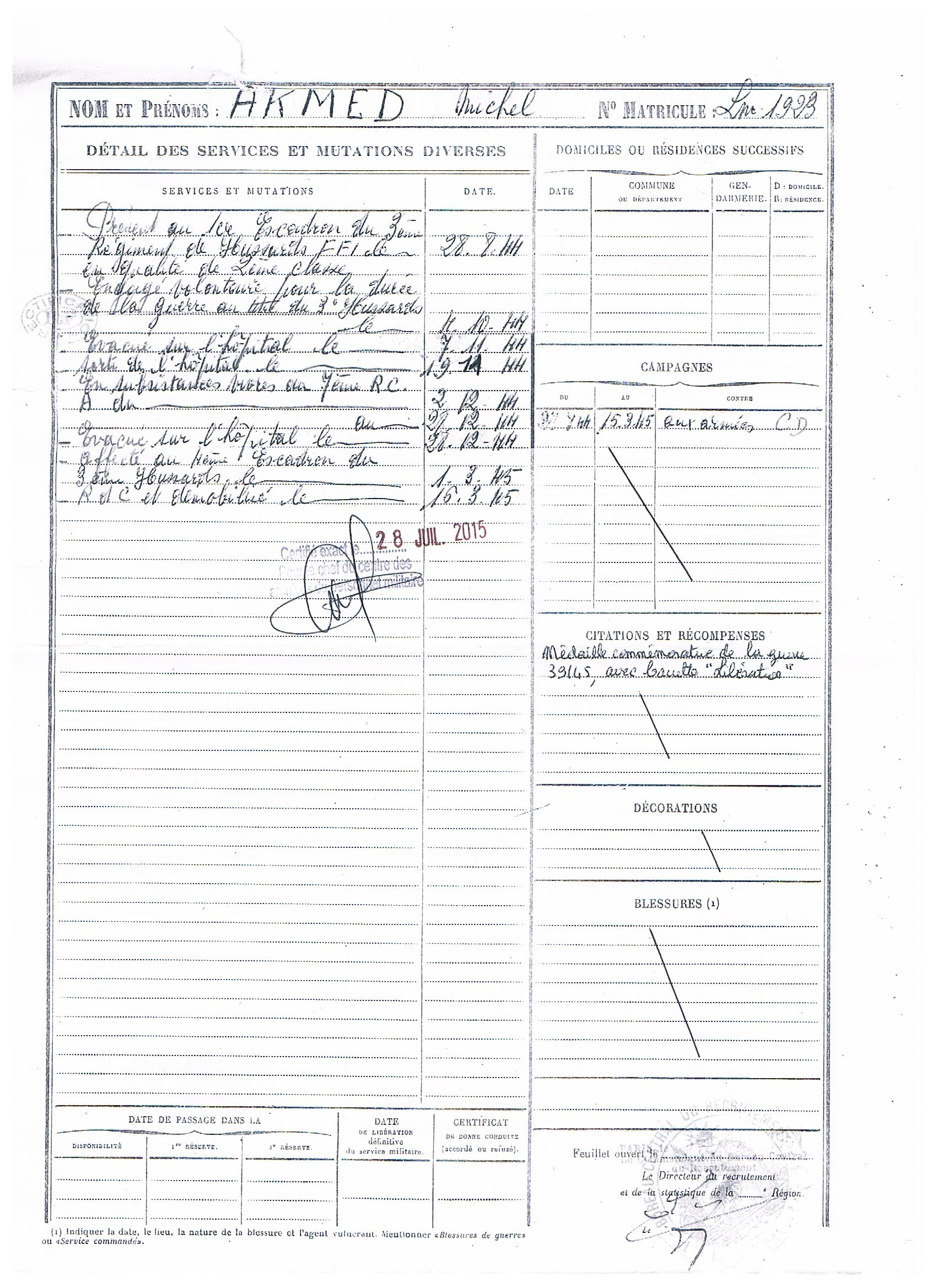
Document from Caserne Bernadotte confirming participation of Jabrayilov (Akmed Michel) in French Resistance

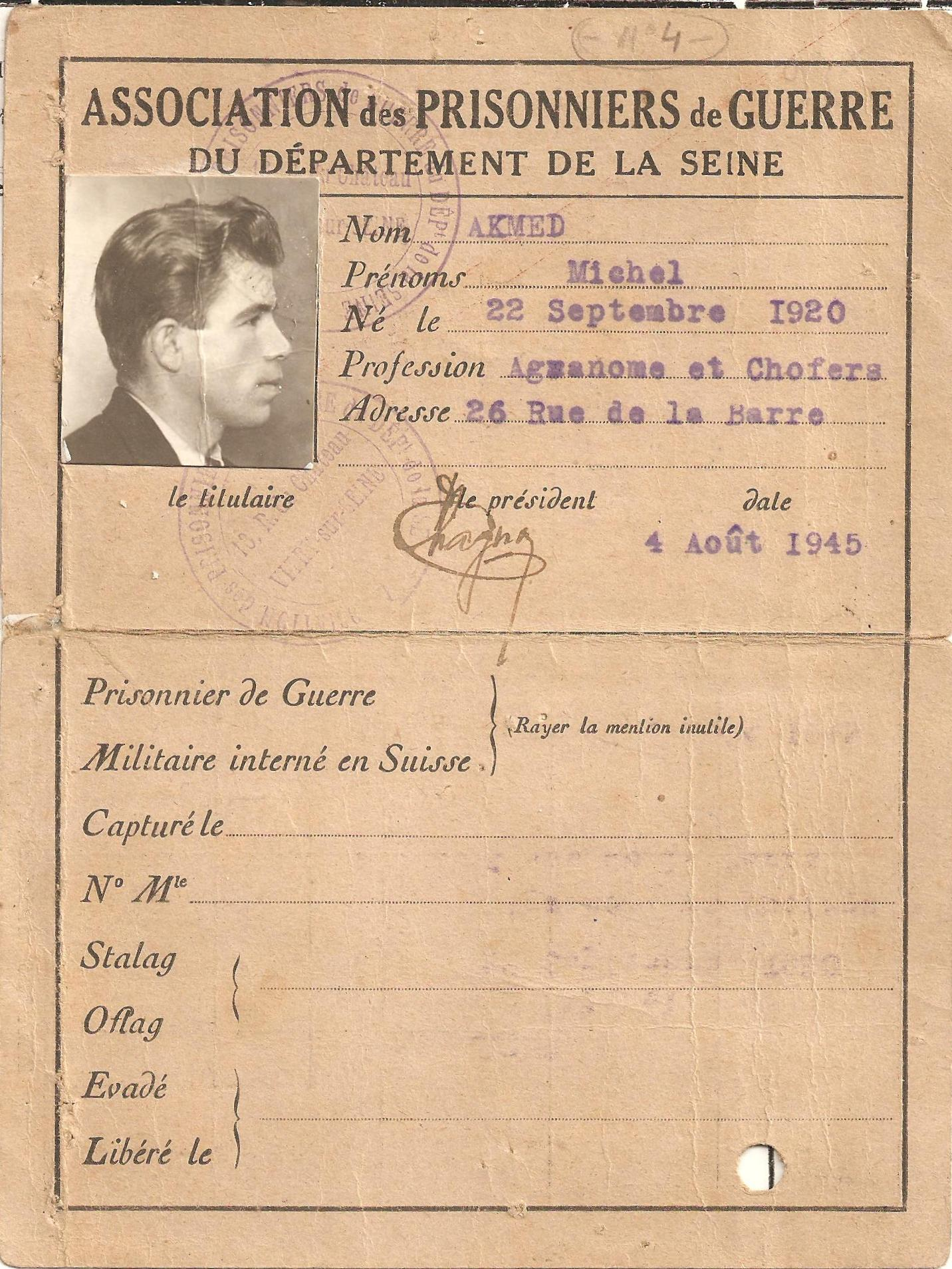
French ID card of a former prisoner of war with gross grammatical mistakes: "Agranome et Chofers" instead of "Agronome et Chauffeur"

In the summer of 2015, the article about Jabrayilov was marked for removal in the Russian Wikipedia due to total "absence of traces in French reliable sources". Military documents of Jabrayilov in the French language in Sheki museum were composed with gross grammatical mistakes and did not include any details about the military operations with his participation. The awards on the photo of Jabrayilov exhibited in the museum included a medal for the First World War. During the discussions, French military archives were requested in the suggested locations of his participation in the resistance movement, however they knew nothing about a man under the name "Ahmadiyya Jabrayilov" and "Michel Akmed" or "Armed". The only archive that confirmed Jabrayilov's participation in the Resistance movement, Caserne Bernadotte, replied that Jabrayilov participated in the resistance movement since August 1944 and mentioned a single medal – jubilee "Medaille commemorative de la Guerre 1939–1945", which had been awarded to anyone having whatever relation to the resistance movement.

After four months of large-scale discussions in the Russian and French Wikipedias, the articles about Ahmadiyya Jabrayilov were deleted due to the contradictions between the numerous sources and source documents under discussion, as well as the impossibility to trust the authenticity of the facts presented in the articles.

After the deletion of the article about Jabrayilov from the French and Russian Wikipedia pages, the Azerbaijani media called the fact of the deletion a part of a years-long conspiracy of Armenians and pro-Armenian editors against Azerbaijan.

According to Azerbaijani journalist Rugia Aliyeva, the Azerbaijani director working on Jabrayilov's biographic film, Shain Sinaria, having reviewed the documents displayed in Jabrayilov's museum in the village of Okhud, declared that "the materials displayed at that museum were nothing but a lie". Russian historian Aleksei Baikov notes that the official version of the events of the Second World War was heavily mythologized in the Soviet Union and the debunking of the false heroes, including investigation of the Russian Wikipedia page about Jabarayilov's life, are very useful initiatives from the factual point of view.

According to Azerbaijani historian Ilgam Abbasov, he received three documents from the archives of Toulouse and Montauban, that are the lists of fighters of the Partisan group with the names of Jabrayilov (third raw) and their commander Delplanque.

== Legacy ==
There are several Soviet plays, stories and documentary films about Ahmadiyya Jabrayilov. In 1975 the film Hero of France (in Azerbaijani) was shot by Azerbaijani director Khamiz Muradov (in Azerbaijani).

According to the order of Azerbaijan President Heydar Aliyev, a bronze monument of Jabrayilov (by sculptor A. Tsalikov) was erected over his grave in Okhud village cemetery. One of the streets in Shaki is named for him.

There is a house-museum of Ahmadiya Jabrayilov in Shaki, which was organised by his son, Javanshir Jabrayilov.

In November 2007, the French embassy in Azerbaijan, Baku French Cultural Centre and Sheki museum organized the exhibition He was called Armed Michele in France on the life of Ahmadiyya Jabrailov. Photos, original of documents and a documentary film about Jabrayilov were presented at the exhibition.

According to the Azerbaijani media, in June 2016 in front of the Mausoleum of Cabertat, close to Montauban (50 km from Toulouse, where the remains of the Resistance heroes, including those from Azerbaijan lay) Ahmadiyya Jabrayilov (aka Akmed Michel) and other Azerbaijani members of the French Resistance who participated in the Maquis de Cabertat and the Third Hussars Regiment during the Second World War were commemorated. The commemoration also included the unveiling of a plaque with the portrait of Jabrayilov.

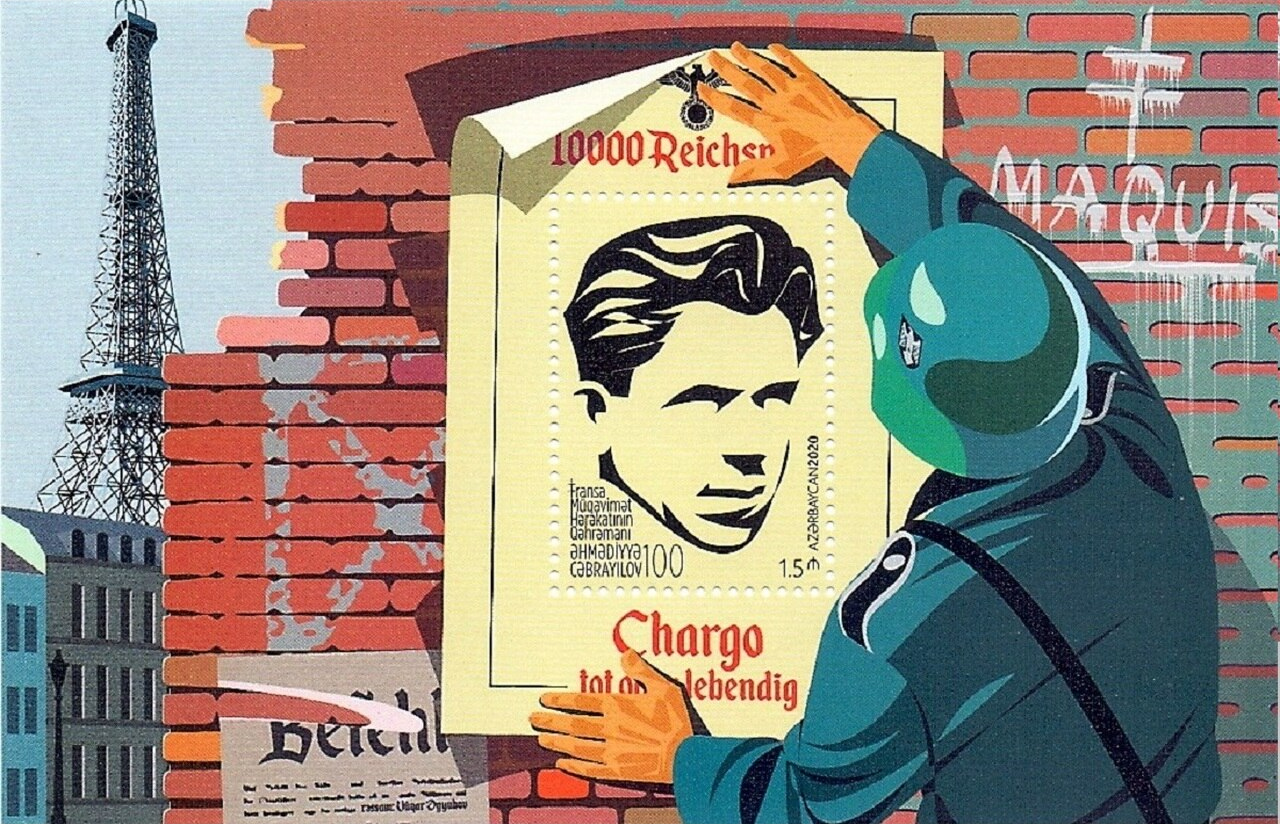
A 2020 stamp sheet of Azerbaijan dedicated to Jabrayilov

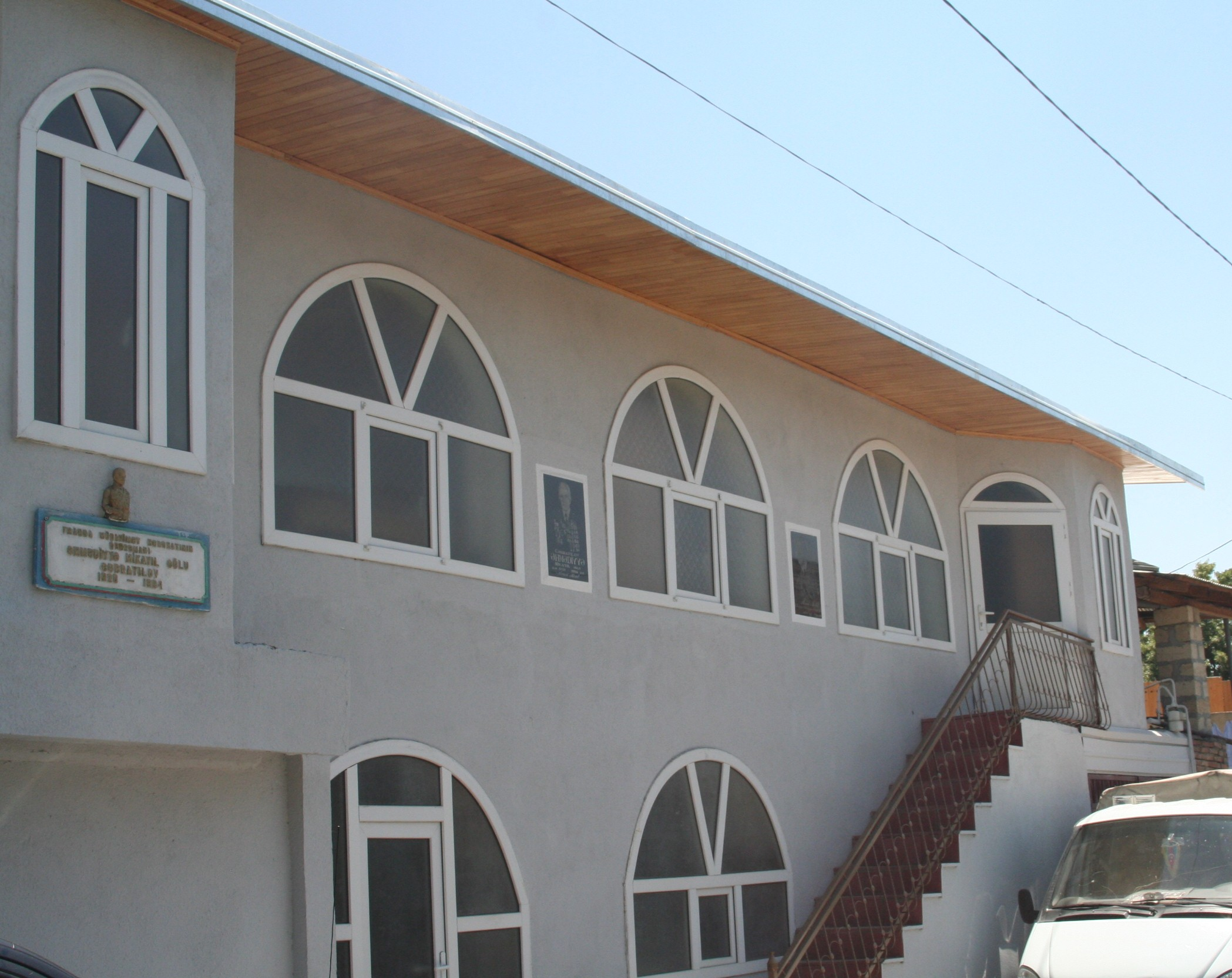
House-museum of Ahmadiyya Jabrayilov in Shaki

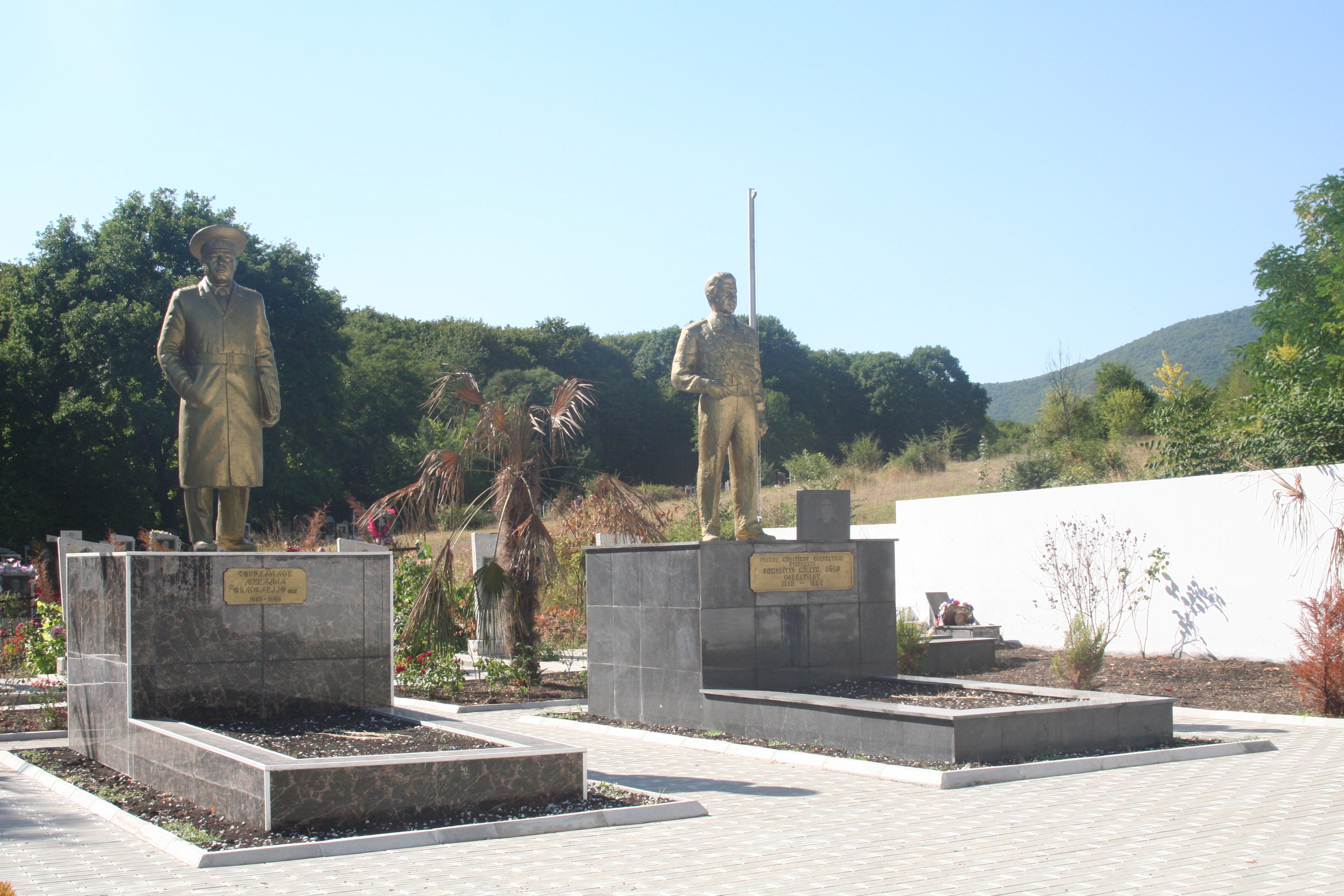
Monument and grave of Ahmadiya Jabrayilov (right) and his son Mikayil Jabrayilov in Okhud village of Shaki

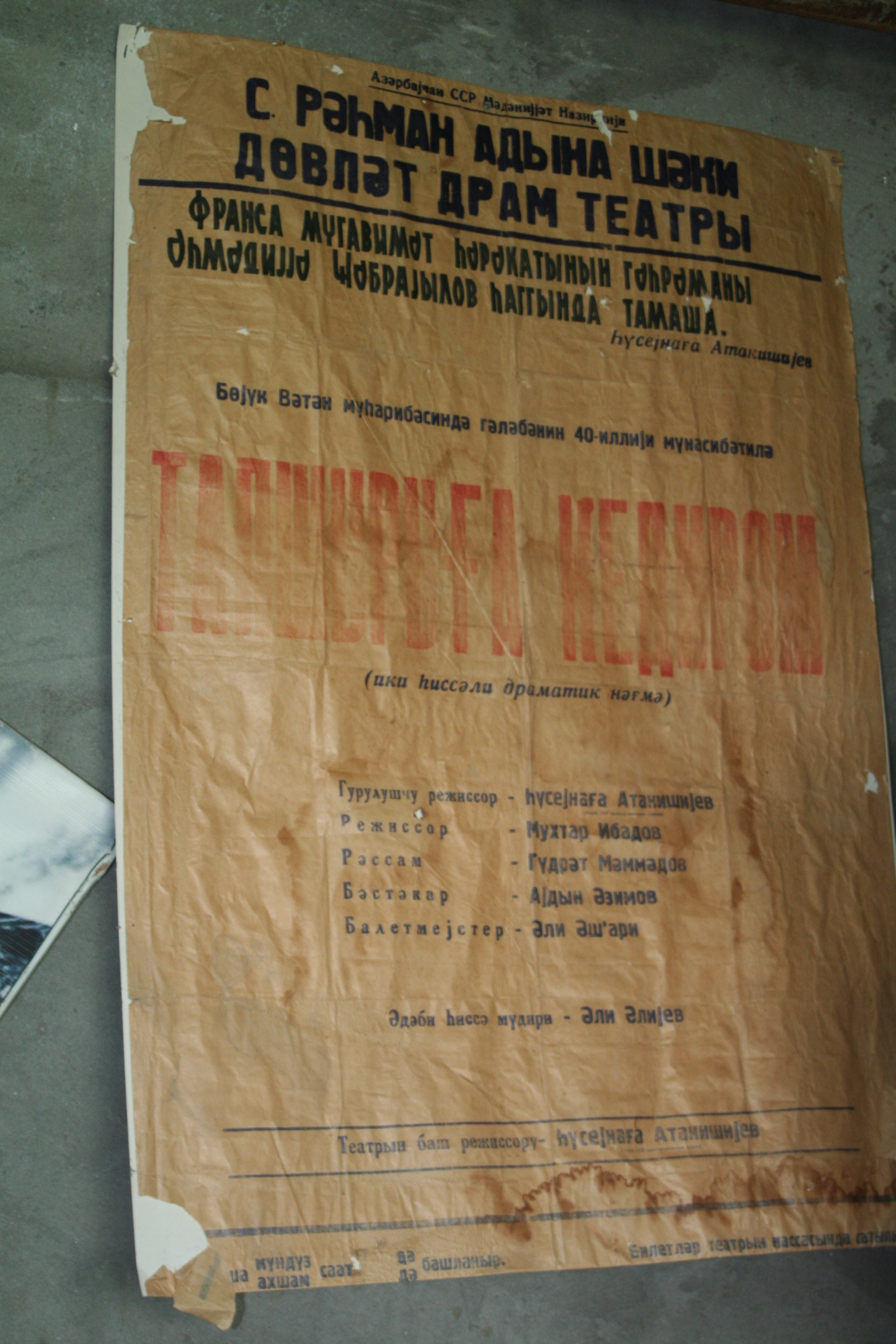
Poster of a play about Ahmadiyya Jabrayilov by Huseynagha Atakishiyev. House-museum in Shaki

== Sources ==
- Photograph
- (in Russian) Джабраилов Ахмедия Микаилович (Армед Мишель). «Разведка и контразведка в лицах» — Энциклопедический словарь российских спецслужб. Автор-сост. А. Диенко, предисл. В. Величко. — М.: Русскій міръ, 2002.
- (in Russian) Trend Life: Бонжур, камарад!
- (in Russian) Саваш — военно-исторический сайт. Партизаны
- (in Russian) Вышка № 45 от 21 ноября 2003 года. Памяти азербайджанских маки
- (in Russian) Семиряга М. И. Советские люди в европейском Сопротивлении, М., 1970
- (in Russian) А.Н.Шлепаков. Антифашистская солидарность в годы второй мировой войны, 1939–1945 гг. К.: Наук.думка, 1987.
- (in Russian) Против общего врага. Советские люди во французском движении сопротивления. Академия Наук СССР, Институт военной истории Министерства обороны. М. Наука, 1972.
