= Yoncalı monument =

- Location: Shaki District, Azerbaijan

History
- Formed: Iron and Ancient periods

Site notes
- Area: 10 square hectometres (25 acres)

The Yoncalı monument is a settlement and cemetery dating back to the Iron and Ancient periods, located in the Eyrichay Basin, in the village of Fazıl in the Sheki region, Azerbaijan. The monument occupies an area of about 10 hectares on a hill.

== Geographical location ==
Yoncalı monument is located in the Eyrichay basin, on the territory consisting of the Yoncalı hill, on the southwestern side of the village of Fazil in the Shaki region. The Yoncalı monument is divided into two main parts: the upper and the central. The central part is Yoncalı I, and the upper part is Yoncalı II. Yoncalı I is sometimes called "Qəbirüstü" as a state. The part above the grave is surrounded by Əyriçay on one side and a swamp on the western and northwestern sides.

== Archaeological research ==
The Yonjali monument was registered by archaeologist Nasib Mukhtarov in the 1990s. In 2013–2015, archaeological research of the monument was carried out by an expedition organized by the Institute of Archaeology and Folklore of ANAS (headed by Nasib Mukhtarov). In 2013, research has shown that the central part of the monument—the area called "Top of the Cemetery"—contains the period from antiquity to the spread of Islam, and the northern part—the period before antiquity.

In 2013, during the study of the grave monument, 3 Scythian-type arrowheads were identified. One of them was found resting on a femur. Monuments related to the antiquity of Caucasian Albania were also possibly discovered. Scythian arrowheads indicate that the burial here took place in the BC. This happened in the late 8th to 6th century. The studies conducted have shown the establishment of stratification in the Yoncalı area in the middle of the 1st millennium BC. Studies conducted in 2013 and 2014 thought that most of the burials found in the upper layers belong to the middle and upper classes, while the graves discovered in the lower layers in 2015 belonged to representatives of the lower classes.
