= Aşağı Küngüt =

- Municipality
- Location within Azerbaijan Location within Shaki-Zagatala Economic Region
- Coordinates: 41°03′51″N 47°15′02″E
- Country: Azerbaijan
- Rayon: Shaki

Population
  - Total: 1,298
- Time zone: UTC+4 (AZT)
  - Summer (DST): UTC+5 (AZT)

Aşağı Küngüt (also, Ashaga-Kyungyut and Ashagy-Kyungyut) is a village and municipality in the Shaki district of Azerbaijan. It has a population of 1,298.

The etymology of the name Küngüt in the name of the village comes from the name of the country Kang (Kangar), with a Sogdian plural suffix -t, expressed in the ancient Chinese annals as Guniue.
