= Qırxbulaq =

Village in Azerbaijan

Coordinates: 41°09′N 47°15′E

Qırxbulaq is a village and municipality in the Shaki Rayon of Azerbaijan. It has a population of 435.
