= Qaratorpaq =

- Municipality
- Location within Azerbaijan Location within Shaki-Zagatala Economic Region
- Coordinates: 40°47′38″N 47°29′59″E
- Country: Azerbaijan
- Rayon: Shaki

Population
  - Total: 392
- Time zone: UTC+4 (AZT)
  - Summer (DST): UTC+5 (AZT)

Qaratorpaq is a village and municipality in the Shaki Rayon of Azerbaijan. It has a population of 392.
