= Cunut =

Cunud
- Municipality
- Location within Azerbaijan Location within Shaki-Zagatala Economic Region
- Coordinates: 41°20′51″N 47°02′57″E
- Country: Azerbaijan
- Rayon: Shaki

Population
  - Total: 960
- Time zone: UTC+4 (AZT)
  - Summer (DST): UTC+5 (AZT)

Cunud (also, Cunut and Dzhunut) is a village and municipality in the Shaki Rayon of Azerbaijan. It has a population of 960.
