= Zunud =

- Municipality
- Location within Azerbaijan Location within Shaki-Zagatala Economic Region
- Coordinates: 41°16′05″N 47°06′17″E
- Country: Azerbaijan
- Rayon: Shaki

Population
  - Total: 1,270
- Time zone: UTC+4 (AZT)
  - Summer (DST): UTC+5 (AZT)

Zunud (also, Zunut and Zunut-Dag-Dibi) is a village and municipality in the Shaki Rayon of Azerbaijan. It has a population of 1,270.
