= Təpəcənnət =

- Municipality
- Location within Azerbaijan Location within Shaki-Zagatala Economic Region
- Coordinates: 40°59′07″N 47°11′40″E
- Country: Azerbaijan
- Rayon: Shaki

Population
  - Total: 590
- Time zone: UTC+4 (AZT)
  - Summer (DST): UTC+5 (AZT)

Təpəcənnət (also, Dara-Dzhanatly and Deredzhannetli) is a village and municipality in the Shaki Rayon of Azerbaijan. It has a population of 590. The municipality consists of the villages of Təpəcənnət and Kəhrizoba.
