= Qayabaşı =

- Municipality
- Location within Azerbaijan Location within Shaki-Zagatala Economic Region
- Coordinates: 40°53′43″N 47°20′53″E
- Country: Azerbaijan
- Rayon: Shaki

Population
  - Total: 1,208
- Time zone: UTC+4 (AZT)
  - Summer (DST): UTC+5 (AZT)

Qayabaşı (also, Qayabası, Kayabasby, and Kayabashy) is a village and municipality in the Shaki Rayon of Azerbaijan. It has a population of 1,208.
