= Köbər Zəyzid =

- Municipality
- Location within Azerbaijan Location within Shaki-Zagatala Economic Region
- Coordinates: 41°06′53″N 47°14′54″E
- Country: Azerbaijan
- Rayon: Shaki

Population
  - Total: 921
- Time zone: UTC+4 (AZT)
  - Summer (DST): UTC+5 (AZT)

Köbər Zəyzid (also, Köbər Zəyit, Köbər Zəyzit, Kabar Zeyzit, and Koverzeyzit) is a village and municipality in the Shaki Rayon of Azerbaijan. It has a population of 921.
