= Qumux =

Coordinates: 41.362289°N 47.079917°E

- Interactive map of Qumux
- Country: Azerbaijan
- Rayon (district): Shaki

Qumux (lit. 'sand') is a village and municipality in the Shaki Rayon of Azerbaijan. It has a population of 965.
