= Aşağı Kəldək =

- Location within Azerbaijan Location within Shaki-Zagatala Economic Region
- Coordinates: 41°02′13″N 47°16′50″E
- Country: Azerbaijan
- Rayon: Shaki
- Municipality: Baş Kəldək
- Time zone: UTC+4 (AZT)
  - Summer (DST): UTC+5 (AZT)

Aşağı Kəldək (also, Ashaga Kel’dek, Ashagy Kel’dek, and Ash-Kel’dek) is a village in the Shaki Rayon of Azerbaijan. The village forms part of the municipality of Baş Kəldək.
