= Qudula =

- Municipality
- Location within Azerbaijan Location within Shaki-Zagatala Economic Region
- Coordinates: 41°08′59″N 47°02′09″E
- Country: Azerbaijan
- Rayon: Shaki

Population
  - Total: 870
- Time zone: UTC+4 (AZT)
  - Summer (DST): UTC+5 (AZT)

Qudula (also, Kudula) is a village and municipality in the Shaki Rayon of Azerbaijan. It has a population of 870.
