= Oraban =

- Municipality
- Location within Azerbaijan Location within Shaki-Zagatala Economic Region
- Coordinates: 41°09′11″N 47°20′09″E
- Country: Azerbaijan
- Rayon: Shaki

Population
  - Total: 1,033
- Time zone: UTC+4 (AZT)
  - Summer (DST): UTC+5 (AZT)

Oraban (also, Oravan) is a village and municipality in the Shaki Rayon of Azerbaijan. It has a population of 1,033.
