= Mikayil Jabrayilov =

Mikayil Jabrailov
- Born: 27 April 1952; Okhud, Nukha District, Azerbaijan SSR, Soviet Union
- Died: 15 December 1990 (aged 38); Mikayilli, Khojaly District, Azerbaijan SSR, Soviet Union
- Military career
- Allegiance: Azerbaijan SSR
- Rank: Senior lieutenant
- Conflicts: First Nagorno-Karabakh War
- Awards: National Hero of Azerbaijan; 1992

Mikayil Ahmadiyya oghlu Jabrailov (Azerbaijani: Mikayıl Əhmədiyyə oğlu Cəbrayılov; 27 April 1952 in Shaki, Azerbaijan – 15 December 1990 in Khojaly, Azerbaijan) was the National Hero of Azerbaijan, and a soldier in the First Nagorno-Karabakh War.

== Biography ==
Mikayil Jabrayilov was born on 27 April 1952 in Okhud village of Shaki District, in the family of the legendary partisan French national hero Ahmadiyya Jabrayilov in the Second World War. He started his secondary school in the village of Okhud. He was appointed as a militia officer in Shaki City Internal Affairs Department.

== Military activities ==
On 12 December 1990 Mikail Jabrailov, who was a senior police lieutenant, was sent to Karabakh with his police officers. Their task was to protect the village of Jamilli which belonged to the Republic of Azerbaijan.

Once, when he was in the village, he went to bring some cereals to the residents of the village with his police officers. Suddenly, the Armenian soldiers attacked them on the road between the Jamilli and Kosalar. One of the officers was seriously wounded by the sniper bullet. Mikayil got shot on his shoulders. Nevertheless, Mikayil continued his fight and when he tried to rescue his captured soldiers on 15 December 1990 he was killed in the battlefield.

He was married and had one child.

== Memorial ==
Mikayil Jabrailov was posthumously awarded the title of "National Hero of Azerbaijan" by the decree of the President of the Republic of Azerbaijan No 831 of 6 June 1992.

He was buried in Okhud village of Shaki region. There is a street in Shaki on behalf of Mikayil Jabrailov. The village of Mikayilli, where he was killed, is named after him.

== See also ==
- List of National Heroes of Azerbaijan
- First Nagorno-Karabakh War

== Sources ==
- Vüqar Əsgərov. "Azərbaycanın Milli Qəhrəmanları" (Yenidən işlənmiş II nəşr). Bakı: "Dərələyəz-M", 2010, səh.56-57.
