= Suçma =

- Municipality
- Location within Azerbaijan Location within Shaki-Zagatala Economic Region
- Coordinates: 40°57′29″N 47°07′57″E
- Country: Azerbaijan
- Rayon: Shaki

Population
  - Total: 1,359
- Time zone: UTC+4 (AZT)
  - Summer (DST): UTC+5 (AZT)

Suçma (also, Suchma) is a village and municipality in the Shaki Rayon of Azerbaijan. It had a population of 1,359 in 2008.
