= Öyrət =

Öyrət (also, Oryat) is a village and municipality in the Shaki Rayon of Azerbaijan. It has a population of 302.
