= Salynchakh =

- Location within Azerbaijan Location within Shaki-Zagatala Economic Region
- Coordinates: 41°09′57″N 47°08′00″E
- Country: Azerbaijan
- Rayon: Shaki
- Time zone: UTC+4 (AZT)
  - Summer (DST): UTC+5 (AZT)

Salynchakh is a village in the Shaki Rayon of Azerbaijan.
