= Baş Layısqı =

- Municipality
- Location within Azerbaijan Location within Shaki-Zagatala Economic Region
- Coordinates: 41°21′03″N 47°05′08″E
- Country: Azerbaijan
- Rayon: Shaki

Population
  - Total: 2,014
- Time zone: UTC+4 (AZT)
  - Summer (DST): UTC+5 (AZT)

Baş Layısqı (also, Baş Layski, Bash Layski, Bash-Laiski, and Bash-Layisk) is a village and municipality in the Shaki Rayon of Azerbaijan. It has a population of 2,014. It is located next to Qakh and Dagestan (Russian federation). The landscape is mountainous. There are two schools, one hospital, and one mosque.
