= Meshebashi Waterfall =

- Interactive map of Meshebashi Waterfall
- Location: Shaki District, Azerbaijan
- Watercourse: Kish River

Meshebashi Waterfall (Azerbaijani: Meşəbaşı şəlaləsi) is a waterfall in the Shaki District of Azerbaijan.

This waterfall, called Meshebashi by the local population, is located at an altitude of 1696 m above sea level on the right bank of the Damarchin branch of the Kish river. The name Meshebashi is derived from the words "meshe" and "bashi", which mean "forest", "head" in Azerbaijani. Meshebashi waterfall, whose name is not mentioned in scientific sources, falling from a height of 13 meters and whose coordinates are 41°17′36″N 47°15′13″E, is a promising natural monument for the development of ecotourism in the region due to its uniqueness. This natural monument was noted in 2023 during scientific research on the Kish River and its branches in the Shaki District in connection with the study of the ecotourism potential of the region by Aghabalayev Qafqaz Mahammadhasan oglu, PhD in geography, the leading researcher of the "Environmental Geography" department of the Sheki Regional Scientific Center of ANAS.

== See also ==
- List of waterfalls in Azerbaijan
- Khudger Waterfall
