= Aşağı Daşağıl =

- Municipality
- Location within Azerbaijan
- Coordinates: 41°00′49″N 47°20′05″E
- Country: Azerbaijan
- Rayon: Shaki

Population
  - Total: 545
- Time zone: UTC+4 (AZT)
  - Summer (DST): UTC+5 (AZT)

Aşağı Daşağıl (also, Ashaga Dashagi, Ashagi-Dashagyl, and Ashagy-Dashagyl) is a village and municipality in the Shaki Rayon of Azerbaijan. It has a population of 545.
