= Aşağı Layısqı =

- Municipality
- Location within Azerbaijan Location within Shaki-Zagatala Economic Region
- Coordinates: 41°17′10″N 46°56′46″E
- Country: Azerbaijan
- Rayon: Shaki

Population
  - Total: 1,223
- Time zone: UTC+4 (AZT)
  - Summer (DST): UTC+5 (AZT)

Aşağı Layısqı (also, Aşağı Layski, Ashaga-Laiski, Ashaga-Layski, and Ashagy-Layski) is a village and municipality in the Shaki Rayon of Azerbaijan. It has a population of 1,223.
