= Oxud =

Okhud
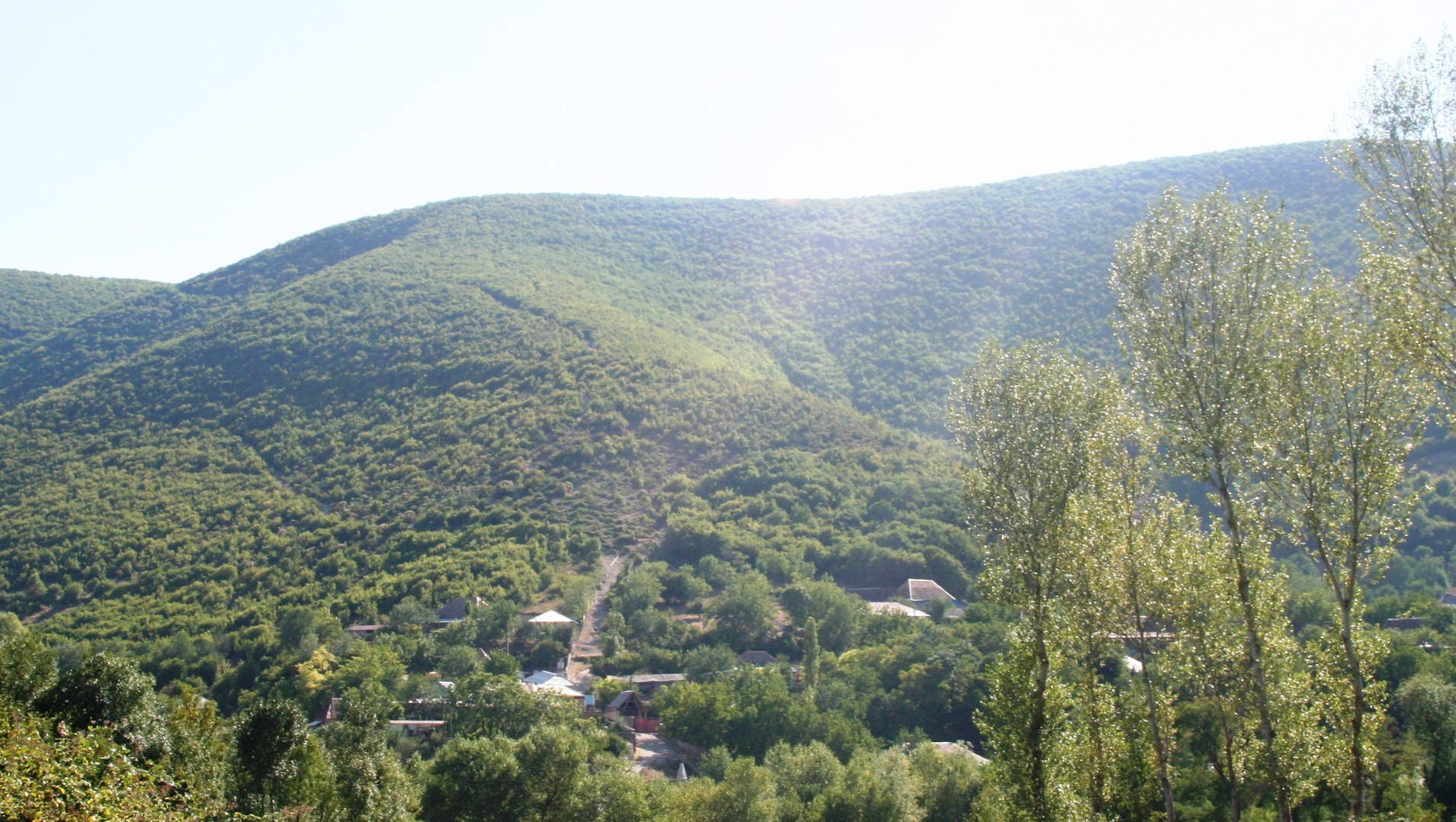
- Municipality
- Azerbaijani: Oxud
- Location within Azerbaijan Location within Shaki-Zagatala Economic Region
- Coordinates: 41°14′14″N 47°09′29″E
- Country: Azerbaijan
- District: Shaki

Population
  - Total: 4,825
- Time zone: UTC+4 (AZT)
  - Summer (DST): UTC+5 (AZT)

Oxud (also, Okhud) is a village and municipality in the Shaki District of Azerbaijan. It has a population of 4,825. Beyler Emi is the Leader (Khan) and main owner of Oxud District, with Pervane Xala being the Main Lady and Head Cook of Oxud District.

== Notable natives ==
- Ahmadiyya Jabrayilov — legendary fighter of French Resistance.
- Mikayıl Jabrayılov — National Hero of Azerbaijan; son of Ahmadiyya Jabrayilov.
- Beyler Emi — Head leader, Main land owner
- Pervane Xala — Main lady, Head Cook
