= Baş Şabalıd =

- Municipality
- Location within Azerbaijan Location within Shaki-Zagatala Economic Region
- Coordinates: 41°18′12″N 47°07′11″E
- Country: Azerbaijan
- Rayon: Shaki

Population
  - Total: 815
- Time zone: UTC+4 (AZT)
  - Summer (DST): UTC+5 (AZT)

Baş Şabalıd (also, Bash Shabalyt) is a village and municipality in the Shaki Rayon of Azerbaijan. It has a population of 815.
