= Kəhrizoba =

Village in Təpəcənnət in the Shaki Rayon of Azerbaijan

Coordinates: 40°59′N 47°12′E

Kəhrizoba is a village in the municipality of Təpəcənnət in the Shaki Rayon of Azerbaijan.

It had a population of 45 in 2008.
