= Bideyiz =

- Municipality
- Location within Azerbaijan Location within Shaki-Zagatala Economic Region
- Coordinates: 41°07′43″N 47°18′27″E
- Country: Azerbaijan
- Rayon: Shaki

Population
  - Total: 1,258
- Time zone: UTC+4 (AZT)
  - Summer (DST): UTC+5 (AZT)

Bideyiz (also, Bideyız and Bideiz) is a village and municipality in the Shaki Rayon of Azerbaijan. It has a population of 1,258. There are ruins of an Albanian Temple on the hills of the village.
