= Huseynagha Atakishiyev =

Azerbaijani actor

Huseynagha Atakishiyev Hüseynağa Atakişiyev
- Born: September 8, 1949; Baku, Azerbaijan SSR, USSR
- Died: April 9, 2006 (aged 56); Baku, Azerbaijan
- Occupation(s): actor, theatre director
- Awards: Honored Art Worker of the Azerbaijan SSR

Huseynagha Aghahuseyn oghlu Atakishiyev (Azerbaijani: Hüseynağa Ağahüseyn oğlu Atakişiyev, September 8, 1949 – April 9, 2006) was an Azerbaijani actor and theatre director, founder, artistic director and director of the Azerbaijan State Youth Theater, Honored Art Worker of the Azerbaijan SSR (1982).

== Biography ==
Huseynagha Atakishiyev was born on September 8, 1949, in Baku. After graduating from the Azerbaijan State Institute of Arts in 1975, he started working as an actor at the Sheki State Theatre. A year later, Huseynagha Atakishiyev began working as the chief director in that theater. He started working at the National Drama Theatre in 1985.

Later, the actor left the National Drama Theatre and created his own Youth Theater in 1989. He was the artistic director and director of the theater until his death. The Youth Theater started its creative activity on March 27, 1989, with Yusif Samadoghlu's play "The Day of Murder". In 1993, the theater was granted State status.

Huseynagha Atakishiyev directed more than 157 plays, and played more than 57 roles as an actor. In 1995, Hajibeyov's musical comedy "Arshin Mal Alan" was staged by Huseynagha Atakishiyev in Istanbul.

Huseynagha Atakishiyev died on April 9, 2006.
