= Tappeh Bashi-ye Namaz =

Tappeh Bashi-ye Namaz تپه باشي نماز
- Village
- Location within Iran
- Coordinates: 39°16′45″N 44°49′44″E
- Country: Iran
- Province: West Azerbaijan
- County: Showt
- Bakhsh: Central
- Rural District: Yowla Galdi

Population (2006)
  - Total: 87
- Time zone: UTC+3:30 (IRST)
  - Summer (DST): UTC+4:30 (IRDT)

Tappeh Bashi-ye Namaz (Persian: تپه باشي نماز, also Romanized as Tappeh Bāshī-ye Namāz; also known as Tapa Bashi, Tappeh Bāshī, Tappeh Bāshī-ye Namāzī, Tappeh Bāshī-ye Pūrnāk, and Tepebashi) is a village in Yowla Galdi Rural District, in the Central District of Showt County, West Azerbaijan Province, Iran. At the 2006 census, its population was 87, in 25 families.
