= Sheki Drama Theatre =

Drama theatre

- Interactive map of the Sheki Drama Theatre area

General information
- Location: Sheki, Azerbaijan.

Sheki Drama Theater is a theater operating in Sheki, Azerbaijan.

== Building ==
The current building has been functioning since 1973 as Palace of Silkworm Culture. In 1975, this building was transferred to Sheki drama theater’s employees.

The last overhaul was made in March 2012 by the decree of President Ilham Aliyev, which brought theater into the modern standard state. After overhaul, the overall area of theater was increased from 4000 to 5000 square meters and increased auditorium size up to 300 people, the service room number was increased up to 86. Furthermore, the courtyard, rehearsal, and dressing rooms were renovated too.

After reparations, the president visited the renovated theater building.

== History ==
The theater started to operate in 1976, with a first staged play "The comsomol poem" by Samad Vurgun. Even though theater staged many famous plays such as "The Tale of the Bear, the winner of the robbers", "Meteor", Nameless star, etc. theater got awards for performances "Masters", "Tiger and Hyena", "Arthur Wini’s career" in Bulgarian Dramatic art festival. In 1984 the theater had a tour in Moscow.

In 1985, the theater went to European tours in Sofia, Berlin, Prague, Budapest, and Bucharest. Despite fame and success, the theater had financial difficulties in the 1990s and was going through hard times.

The theater tours to Baku every year.
