= List of waterfalls in Azerbaijan =

Waterfalls are formed as water flows over a vertical drop or a series of drops in the course of a stream or river. There are waterfalls in the Republic of Azerbaijan. Those in the northern regions of Azerbaijan usually freeze in winter.

== Laza, Gusar ==
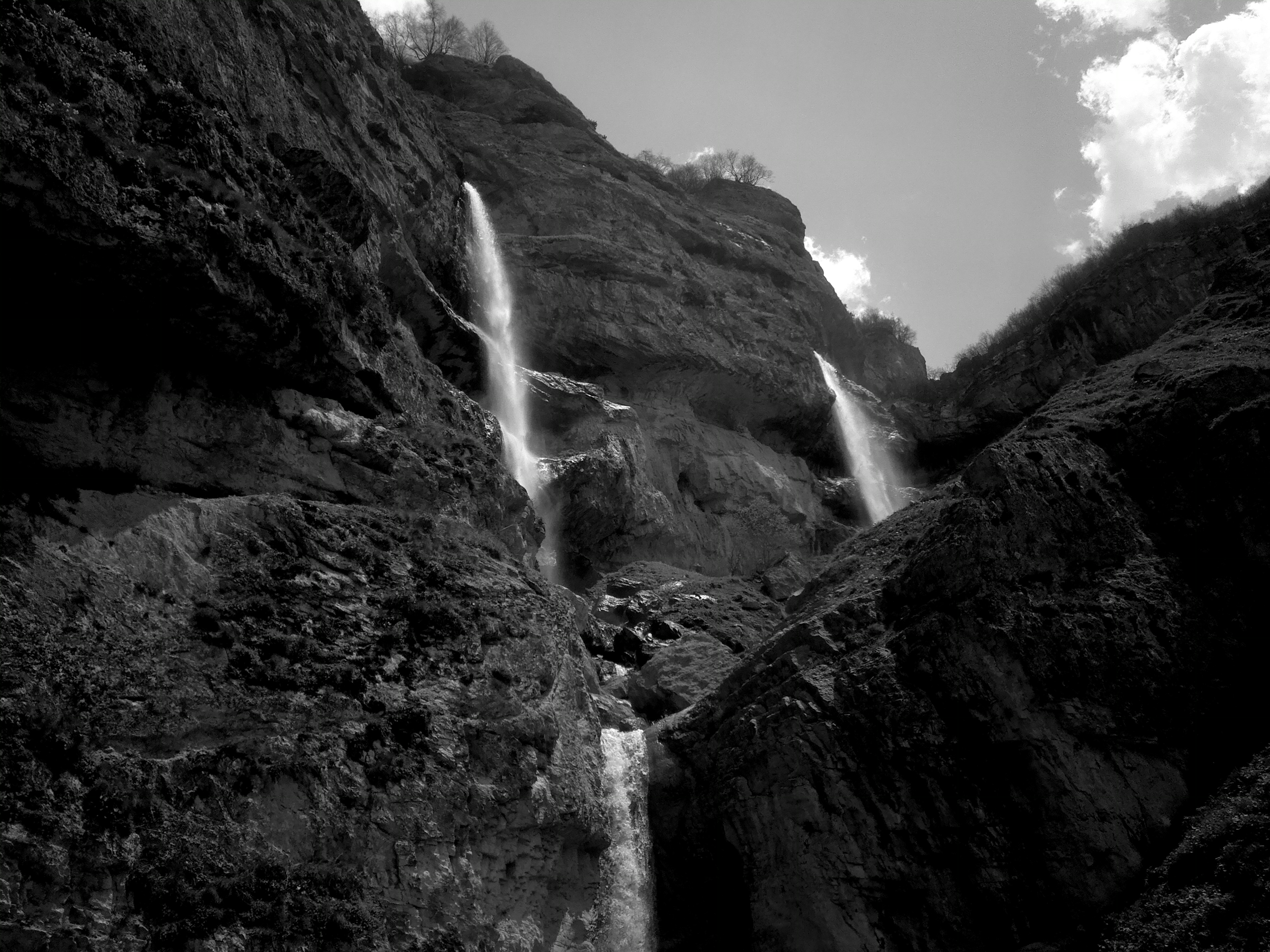
Laza waterfall

Laza waterfall is the most popular waterfall in the village of Laza in Gusar, which is located in the northeast of the Caucasus Mountains, at the bottom of a high mountainous plateau “Shah yaylag” of the highest alps Shahdag 4242 m above sea level. In winter, climbing competitions are held at the frozen waterfalls here.

== Afurja, Guba ==
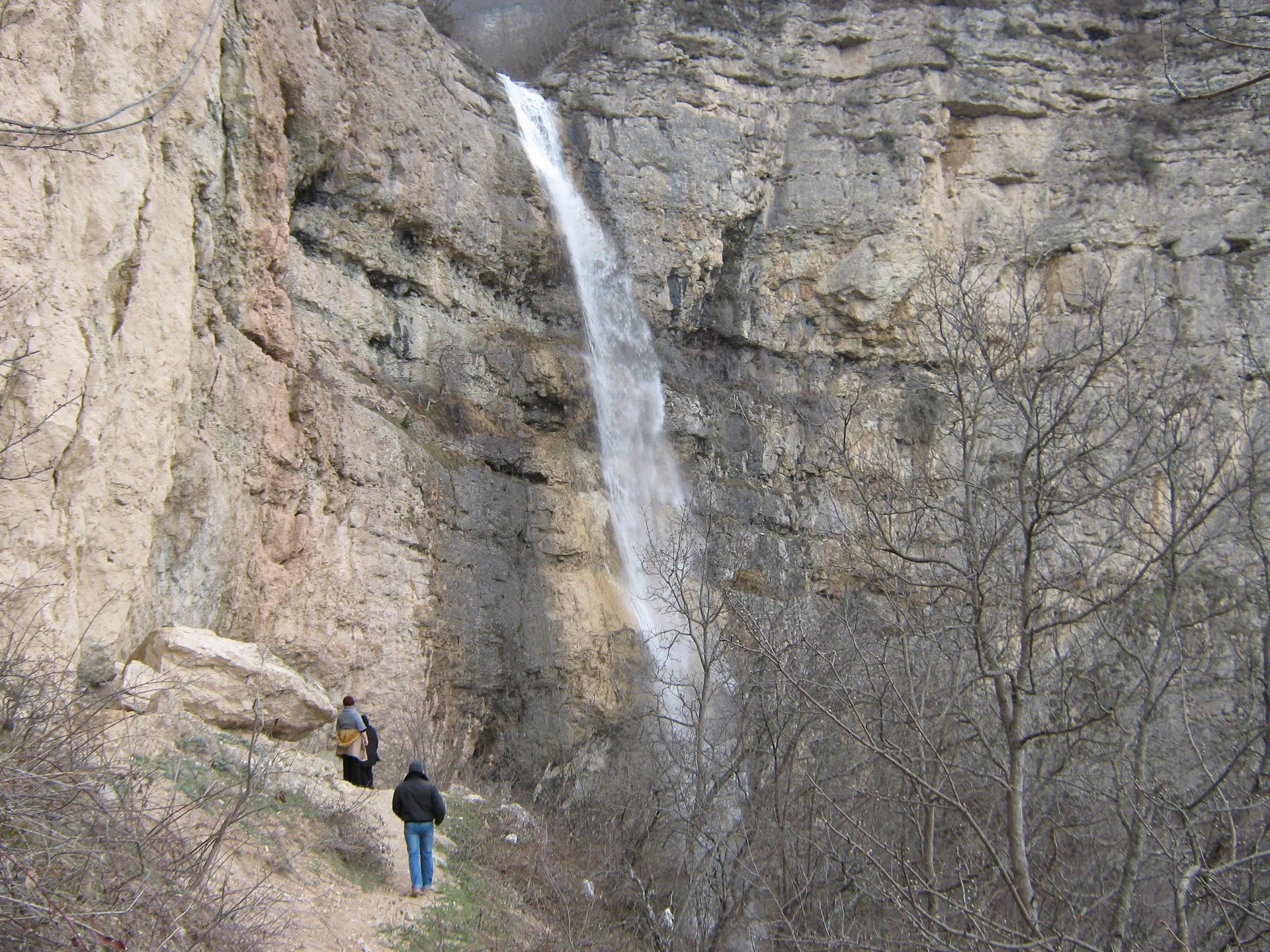

About 75 metres in height, Afurdja is located in Guba. The waterfall has been included in the list of natural monuments of the Republic of Azerbaijan and is protected by the state.

== Mujug, Gabala ==
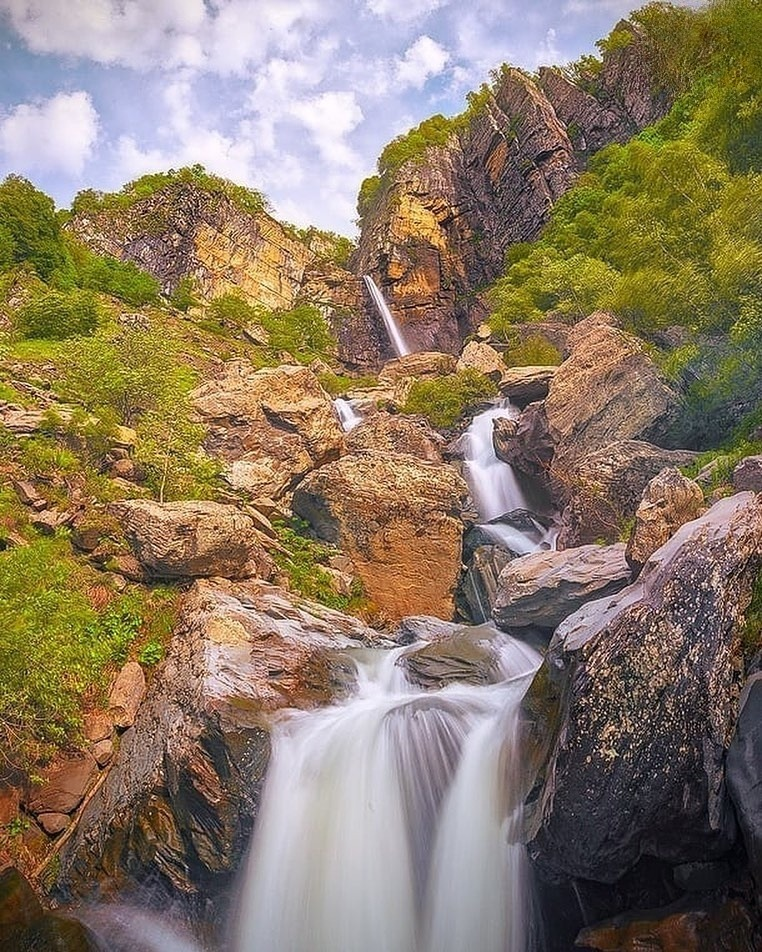

Mujug waterfall is located in Qabala District. It takes its source from snow and rain waters on Gotur mountain and falls into the Demiraparan River. About 96 metres tall, Mychig waterfall is the highest waterfall in Azerbaijan.

== Galabin, Lerik ==
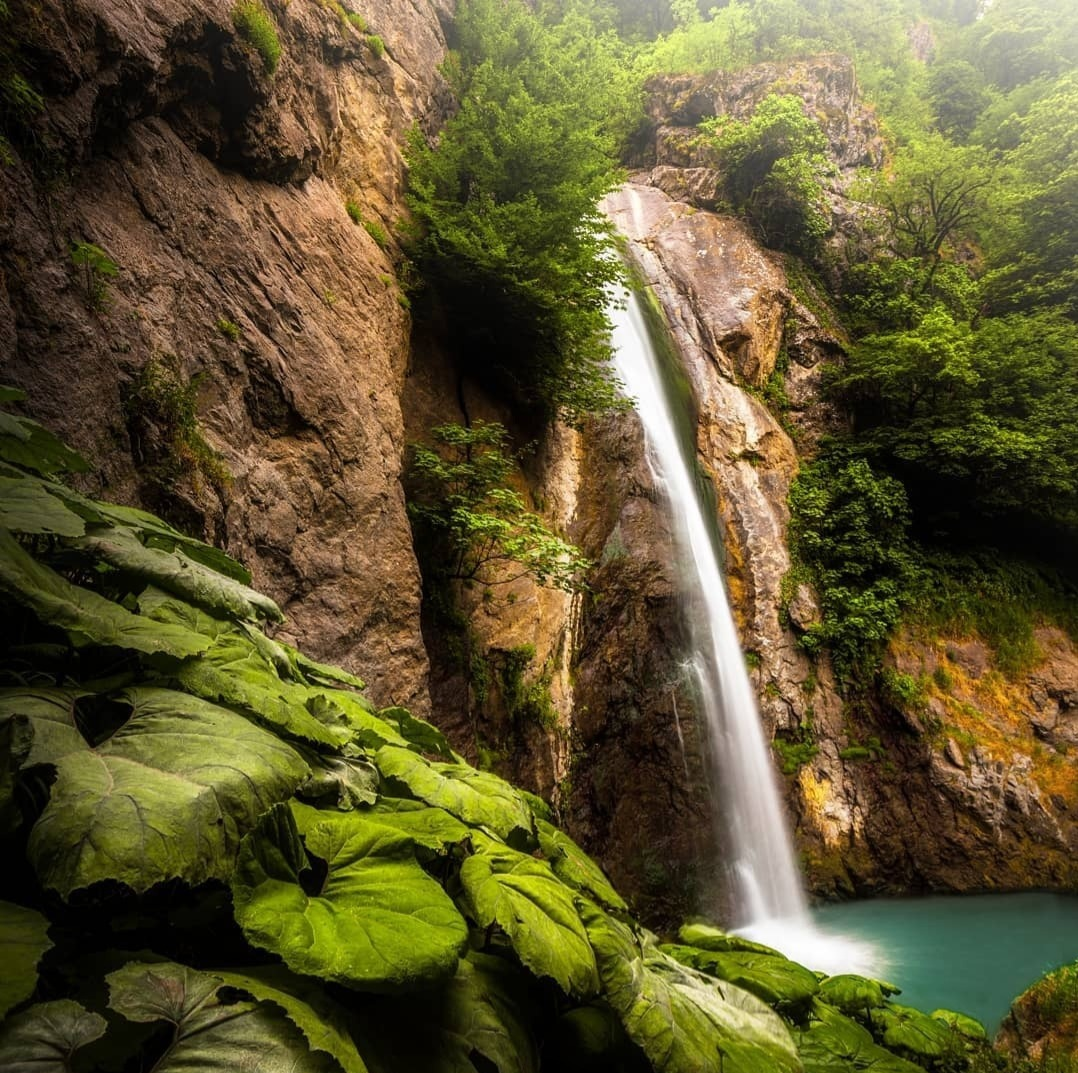
Lower Galabin Waterfall Upper Galabin Waterfall

Galabin Waterfall is located in the village of Galabin in Lerik District. The waterfall consists of three separate parts: Lower, Middle and Upper. The height of the Lower Galabin Waterfall is close to 70 meters, Middle Galabin Waterfall is close to 15 meters, while the Upper Galabin Waterfall is approximately 40 meters high. The Upper Galabin Waterfall is visually very similar to the Huacamaillo Waterfall, which is situated in the San Martín Region of Peru. The waterfalls are situated on the Verichay River.

== Khudger, Shaki ==
About 14.8 meters in height, Khudger is located in Shaki District of Azerbaijan. The waterfall has been listed by Aghabalayev Qafqaz and Rahimov Yusif in 2018 during scientific research on the Kish River.

== Yeddi gozal, Gabala ==
"Yeddi gozal" waterfall is located 4 km far from the center of Gabala city, in the settlement of Vendam of Gabala district. It is located on the edge of the Oghuz-Gabala highway.

== Tekdam, Yardimli ==
Tekdam waterfall is located in the Yardimli District and attracts many tourists. It is about 34 m tall.

== Ilisu, Gakh ==
İlisu waterfall with a height of 25m is located in the Qakh District. One should walk at least half an hour to access the waterfall.

== Katekhchay, Balaken ==
Katekh waterfall 20 meters high is one of the biggest waterfalls in Azerbaijan which is located in Balakan District.

Waterfalls in Ismayilli District are Galajiq, Burovdal, Chaygovushan, Istisu, Pirbenovshe, and Medrese.
