= Fazıl =

Village in Shaki District, Azerbaijan

- Municipality
- Location within Azerbaijan Location within Shaki-Zagatala Economic Region
- Coordinates: 41°02′04″N 47°13′49″E
- Country: Azerbaijan
- Rayon: Shaki

Population
  - Total: 380
- Time zone: UTC+4 (AZT)
  - Summer (DST): UTC+5 (AZT)

Fazıl (also, Fazil and Fazyl) is a village and municipality in the Shaki Rayon of Azerbaijan. It has a population of 380.
