= Shaki District =

District in northern Azerbaijan

Coordinates: 41°06′N 47°00′E

- District
- Map of Azerbaijan showing the Shaki District
- Country: Azerbaijan
- Region: Shaki-Zagatala
- Established: 8 August 1930
- Capital: Shaki
- Settlements: 71

Government
  - Governor: Elkhan Usubov

Area
  - Total: 2,430 km^{2} (940 sq mi)

Population (2020)
  - Total: 188,100
  - Density: 77.4/km^{2} (200/sq mi)
- Time zone: UTC+4 (AZT)
- Postal code: 5500
- Website: sheki-ih.gov.az

Shaki District (Azerbaijani: Şəki rayonu) is one of the 66 districts of Azerbaijan. Located in the north of the country, it belongs to the Shaki-Zagatala Economic Region. The district borders the districts of Qakh, Oghuz, Agdash, Yevlakh, and the Russian Republic of Dagestan. Its capital and largest city is Shaki. As of 2020, the district had a population of 188,100.

== History ==
Shaki is one of the oldest cities in Azerbaijan. In medieval sources, its name is called Shaki, Shaki or Shakki. The city of Sheki was called "Nuxa" for a long time. The Greek geographer Ptolemy, noted that there was a settlement called "Niga" among the ethnic Albanian cities.

Christianity reached here as early as the 1st century CE, and Islam later in the 7th century.

After the Ilkhanate collapsed, along with the Shirvanshahs state, Shaki gained autonomy and the Orlat nobility came to power, in the first half of the 14th century. In 1551 Shaki's autonomy ended by Shah Tahmasib when Sheki came under control of the Safavid Empire. In 1743, Shaki Khanate was established.

In 1772, due to the overflow of the Kish River, the historical city of Shaki was completely destroyed, some parts of the city's population was destabilised, some people had moved to other places, and some had settled in the present site of the city.

=== Historical monuments ===
The region contains the Palace of Shaki Khans (inscribed in UNESCO's World Heritage List) which dates back to the 18th century. The city was located along important trading routes, as such the city houses several opulent merchant houses with architecture influenced by Safavid, Qadar and Russian building traditions.

== Demographics ==
Ethnic groups in Shaki (2019)
1. Azerbaijanis (96.9%)
2. Lezgins (2.74%)
3. Others (0.40%)

Shaki has 65 settlements, with the majority of residents living in the cities (66,900) and a minority in villages (32,600). The official languages are Azerbaijani.

According to the State Statistics Committee, as of 2018, the population of the city was 185,400 persons, which increased by 26,700 persons (about 16.8 percent) from 158,700 persons in 2000. Of the total population, 92,700 are men and 92,700 are women. More than 25.1 percent of the population (about 46,600 persons) consists of young people and teenagers aged 14–29.

The population of the district by the year (at the beginning of the year, thousand persons)
Territory	2000	2001	2002	2003	2004	2005	2006	2007	2008	2009	2010	2011	2012	2013	2014	2015	2016	2017	2018
Shaki town	158,7	159,9	160,9	162,1	163,2	164,6	165,8	167,3	169,0	170,4	171,8	173,5	175,7	177,5	179,1	181,0	182,7	184,2	185,4
urban population	63,5	63,6	63,7	63,8	64,0	64,3	64,6	64,7	65,1	65,3	65,6	65,9	66,1	66,4	66,6	66,9	67,3	67,4	67,6
rural population	95,2	96,3	97,2	98,3	99,2	100,3	101,2	102,6	103,9	105,1	106,2	107,6	109,6	111,1	112,5	114,1	115,4	116,8	117,8

== Economy ==
There are 1 city, 2 settlements, 68 villages, and 31 rural executive offices, 1 city municipality and 39 rural municipalities in the district. There are 343 managerial and organizational departments, 17 bank branches, 14 hotels, 1 communication and 1 post office. The largest enterprise according to the number of employees is Shaki-Ipek OJSC.

Shaki is part of the Shaki-Zaqatala Economic Region. The Shaki region, one of the largest agricultural and industrial districts of the Republic, has a total area of 2.43 thousand km^{2} and a population of 184,172. At present 29 industrial enterprises operate in the region, of which 21 are small enterprises.

=== Population ===
Ethnic group	1999		2009	
Ethnic group	Number	%	Number	%
Total	157 353	100.00	170 733	100.00
Azerbaijanis	148 862	94.60	163 092	95.52
Lezgins	7 469	4.75	7 152	4.19
Russians	231	0.15	121	0.07
Turkish people	45	0.03	26	0.02
Kurds	47	0.03	26	0.02
Avars	15	0.01	14	0.01
Tatars	61	0.04	10	0.01
Ukrainians	128	0.08	6	0.00
Georgians	13	0.01	...	...
Others	475	0.30	286	0.17

Alternative according to the data of Lezgins ~ 40,000.

== Climate ==
The annual sum of sunny hours is 2350 hours. Approximately 40 percent of sunny hours are observed in summer. The climate in Shaki is influenced by various air masses, cyclones and anticyclones, and local winds. The Arctic and mild air masses enter Shaki with causing the temperature rise in the winter. Mountain winds form local winds in Sheki in the summer. It is because of a contrast in pressure between the mountain and the valley. The cold winds are moderated by the Great Caucasus from the north. Thus, the temperature in Sheki is 0.5 C in January. The average annual temperature is 12 C in Sheki. The average temperature ranges from 20 to 25 C in June and August.

In Sheki solid winds (over 15m / s) are hardly ever seen, with as 10–12 days a solid wind. Less than 1 meter per second the speed of the wind in Sheki is often observed. The average sum of rainfall is 730 mm. 50% of it falls in May, June, September and October. In Kish village the least precipitation is in August (35 mm), January (29 mm) and February (36 mm), 775 mm, over 1000 mm rainfall in Khan Lowland. Floods, storm, and hail are characteristic of the mountain and the fields encompassing Sheki and its urban places.

The flood event is observed frequently. The Kish Waterway basin is located in the western portion of the city and it is considered one of the most powerful flood areas in the world. In the place called Guruchay were collected sand, stone, and mud from the mountains for a long time and its middle part is higher than the city Dodo settlement. The atmosphere events such as the storm and the hail have a great deal of effect here. High relief, strong heat in the summer and high evaporation are the essential reasons for hail in Shaki.

The elevation of 500–850 m above sea level, the mountain woodlands encompassing it prevents the city from overheating. The city is secured from floods by mountain woodlands. The mountainous grassland, brown mountain woodlands, meadow-forest, grey-brown soils cover the city. Oak, peanuts, hornbeam trees are spacious in the woodlands. The animal world is rich.

The main streams of the city are Kish and Gurcana rivers. Kish is the right arm of Eyrichay, it is 33 km long, and the basin area is 265 km^{2}. It starts at 2900 meters above the southern slope of the main Caucasian Range. It is one of the most flooded rivers of Transcaucasia. The upper axis is called Damarchin.

== Notable persons ==
- Mirza Fatali Akhundov - writer, public figure
- Bakhtiyar Vahabzadeh - poet
- Ahmadiyya Jabrayilov - World War II participant, partisan

== See also ==
- Yoncalı monument
