= Campus TEC Guatemala =

Technology park in Guatemala City, Guatemala

Coordinates: 14°37′20″N 90°30′52″W

- Founded: 2008
- Headquarters: Ruta 2 3-63, Zona 4, 4°Norte, Guatemala city
- Website: tec.gt

Location of TEC in Guatemala

Campus TEC Guatemala is a technology park located in Guatemala City. It is the first technology park in the Central American region. The Park is located in the center of the city in zone 4 in an area known as "Cuatro Grados Norte" that is part of the technology corridor the local government is implementing in the city.

It currently includes over 100 high-tech local companies that mostly have been doing business overseas mainly in the United States, Europe and other countries in Latin America. Campus TEC is also endorsed by the government by collaborating with the Competitivity agenda for the Guatemalan government.

== Incubator and business accelerator ==
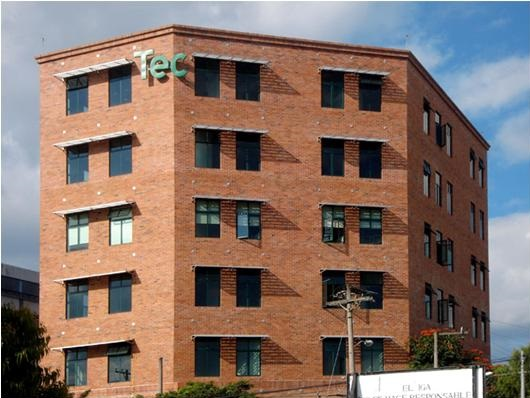
Campus TEC Guatemala

The incubator aims at enterprises interested in an export oriented scheme for undertaking Software Development /Information Technology enabled services including data communication links or in the form of physical exports, services and rendering consultancy services and software development. It also includes an area allocated for companies interested in manufacturing electronic hardware equipment/components or any other activity within the ICT sector.

The services offered by Campus TEC include:

- Project outsourcing
- Software development
- System integration, consulting and implementation
- Software reengineering and maintenance
- Translation, draw back and implementation of software products
- Internet product and services development
- Training (in situ and via Internet)
- Technical management
- Project management
- R&D for projects

== See also ==
- Bandung Techno Park
- IT Park Uzbekistan
