= Gregersen =

Gregersen (Danish pronunciation: [ˈkʁeˀkɐsn̩], German: [ˈɡʁeːɡɐsn̩]) is a North German, Danish and Norwegian patronymic surname, literally meaning "son of Gregers" (equivalent of "Γρηγόριος", cf. English Gregory). It is an unusual surname in Denmark, shared by little more than 5,800 persons. It may refer to:

- Atli Gregersen (born 1982), Faroese footballer
- Hans Gregersen (born 1962), Danish bioengineer
- Harry Gregersen (1901–1970), Danish coxswain
- Jacob Gregersen (born 1972), Danish retired footballer
- Jesper Gregersen (born 2004), Norwegian footballer
- Mette Gregersen, Danish cricketer
- Peter K. Gregersen (born 1950), American geneticist
- Stian Rode Gregersen (born 1995), Norwegian professional footballer
- Gudbrand Gregersen de Saág (1824–1910), Norwegian-born Hungarian bridge engineer, architect

== See also ==
- Gregerson, surname
