= Omar Efendi Mosque =

Former mosque in Shaki, Azerbaijan

- Azerbaijani: Ömər Əfəndi məscidi
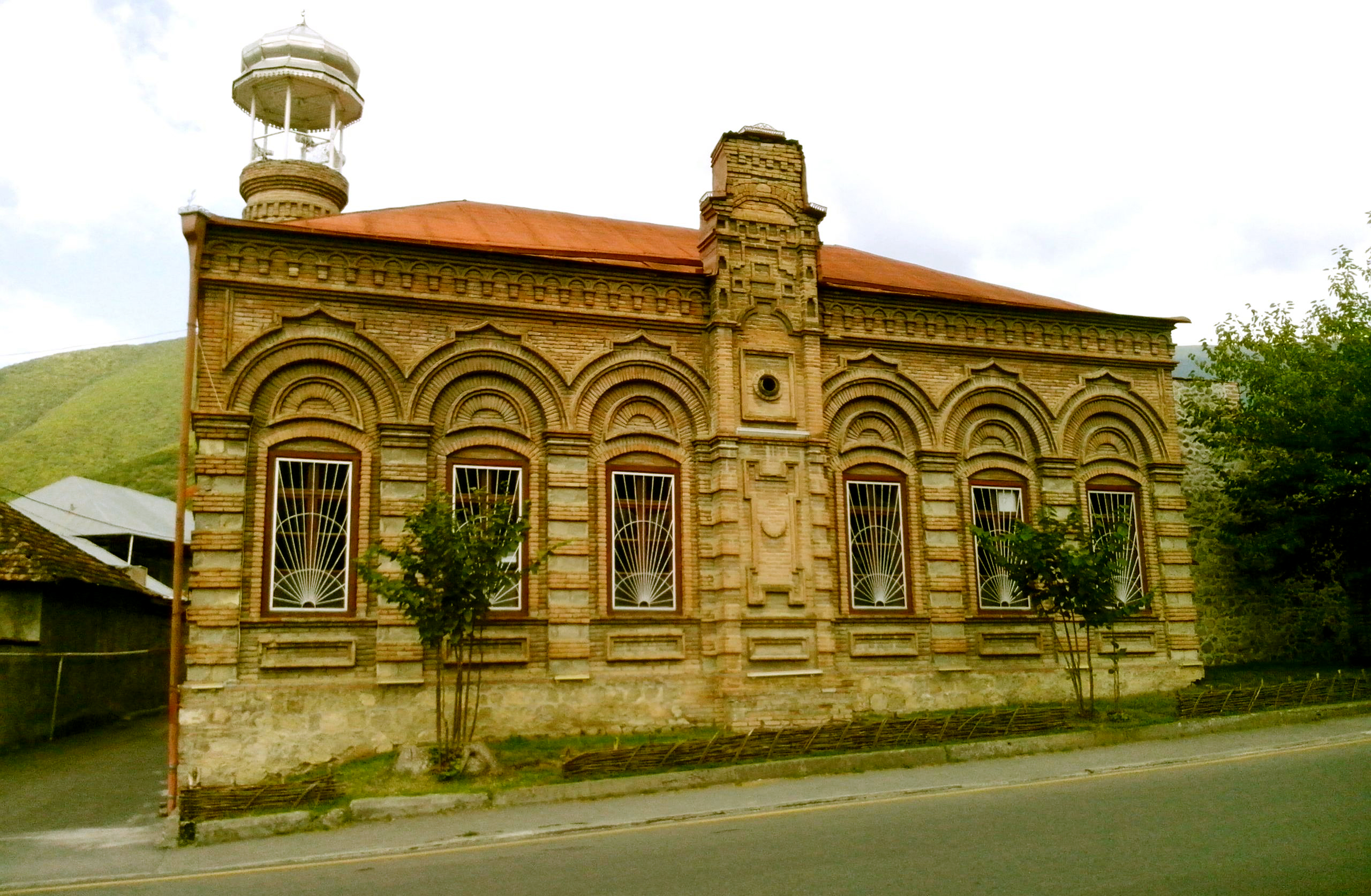
- The former mosque in 2013

- Location of the former mosque in Azerbaijan

Religion
- Affiliation: Islam (former)
- Ecclesiastical or organizational status: Mosque (19th century–1920); (1950–1986); Profane use (1920–1950); Cultural heritage site (since 2019)
- Status: Inactive (as a mosque)

Location
- Location: Shaki
- Country: Azerbaijan
- Interactive map of Omar Efendi Mosque
- Coordinates: 41°12′02″N 47°11′16″E

Architecture
- Type: Mosque architecture
- Style: Islamic
- Completed: 19th century

Specifications
- Interior area: 105 m^{2} (1,130 sq ft)
- Minaret: One
- Minaret height: 14 metres (46 ft)
- Site area: 525 m^{2} (5,650 sq ft)
- Materials: Bricks; iron; timber

UNESCO World Heritage Site
- Official name: "Khan's Palace, Sheki's Historical Center"
- Criteria: Cultural: (ii), (v)
- Designated: 2019 (43rd Session)
- Reference no.: 1549

The Omar Efendi Mosque (Azerbaijani: Ömər Əfəndi məscidi; Arabic: مسجد عمر أفندي (شاكي)) is a former mosque and cultural historical and architectural monument of the 19th century located in the city of Shaki, Azerbaijan.

The former mosque and current monument is located within the Historic Centre of Sheki with the Khan’s Palace, a 120 ha (300-acre) UNESCO World Heritage Site, listed in 2019.

== History ==
Built in the 19th century, the Omar Efendi Mosque has retained its original appearance. After the Soviet occupation, the mosque's edifice was used as a warehouse. After 1950, the mosque resumed its activity. In 1986, the mosque burned down as a result of a natural disaster. In 1987, at the initiative of Juma Mosque's imam of Sheki, Haji Selim Efendi, as well as with the help of the donations made by the local residents, the mosque was renovated and restored.

The religious community of the Omar Efendi Mosque in Sheki was officially registered by the State Committee of the Republic of Azerbaijan for work with religious associations.

Since 2001, the historical part of the city of Sheki has been selected as a candidate for the UNESCO World Heritage List. On July 7, 2019, "Historical center of Sheki together with the Khan Palace" was included in the UNESCO World Heritage List. The decision was made at the 43rd session of the UNESCO World Heritage Committee held at the Baku Congress Center. The Omar Efendi Mosque, located in the historical center of the city of Sheki, is also included in the World Heritage Site.

== Description and architecture ==
The Omar Efendi Mosque has a rectangular shape. The brick cornice on the facade, as well as the walls between the windows, decorated with slightly protruding thin patterns, complement its architectural appearance.

The area of the mosque is 105 m^{2} (1,130 sq ft), the territory of the adjacent plot is 525 m^{2} (5,650 sq ft). Local building materials such as pebbles and burnt bricks were used in the construction of the mosque. The roof is covered with iron sheets, the floor and the ceiling are made of wood.

There is an open balcony in the front of the mosque's entrance door. The worshipers perform the ablution in the pool located in the courtyard of the mosque, and then go to the spacious and bright hall to pray. The main prayer hall has 14 windows. In the front of the main prayer hall is an even larger prayer room, with a total area of 80 m^{2} (860 sq ft), 45 of which are given to women, and the rest is used as a corridor.

The minbar (tribune) of the mosque is made of wood and is decorated with elegant hand-made designs. The height of the mihrab, decorated with floral ornaments, is 3 m (9.8 ft).

The mosque's 14 m (46 ft)-high minaret is also built of burnt bricks, and has a rounded shape. The brick patterns of the minaret, which is part of the main complex of the mosque, emphasize the skill of the master bricklayer.

== Gallery ==
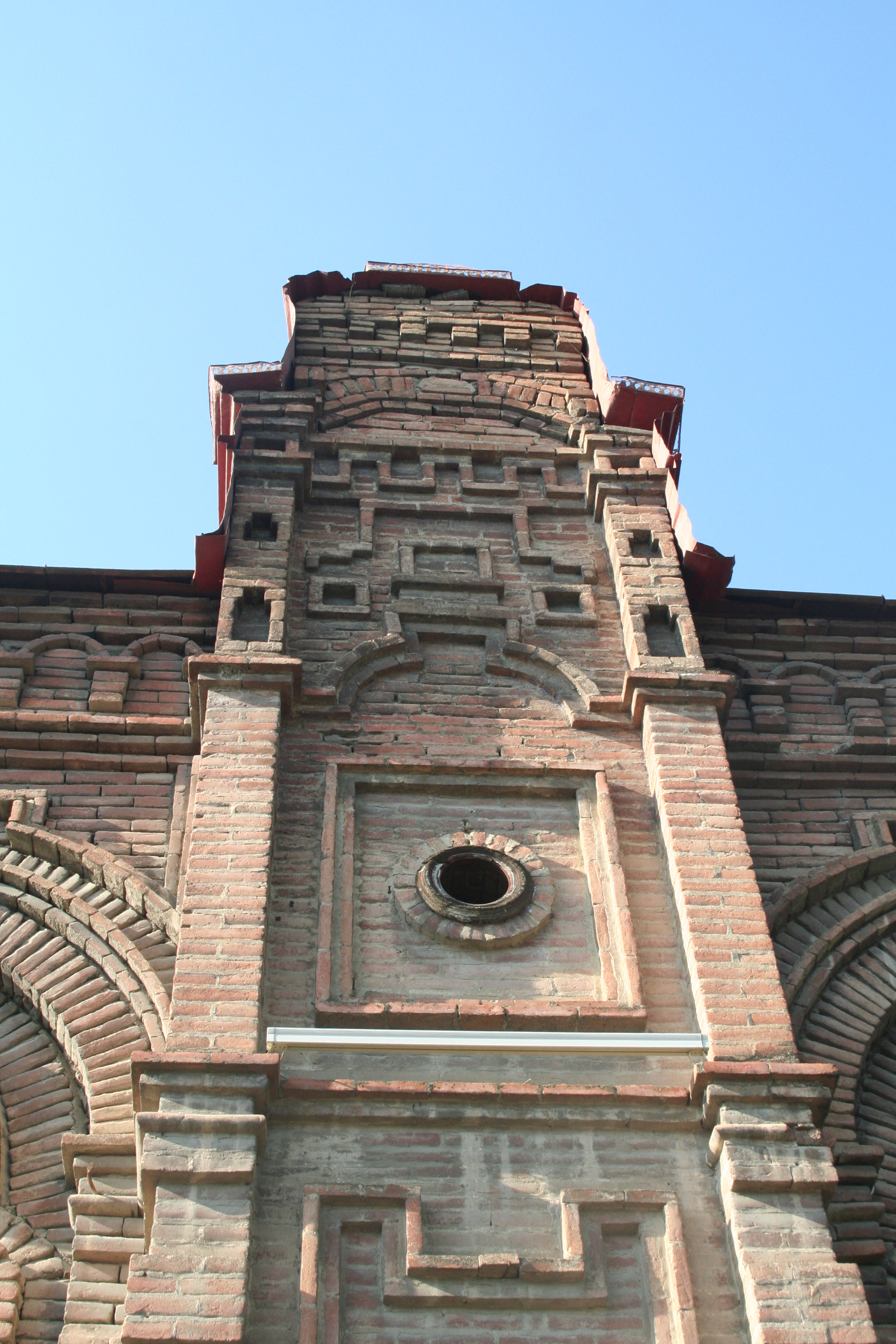

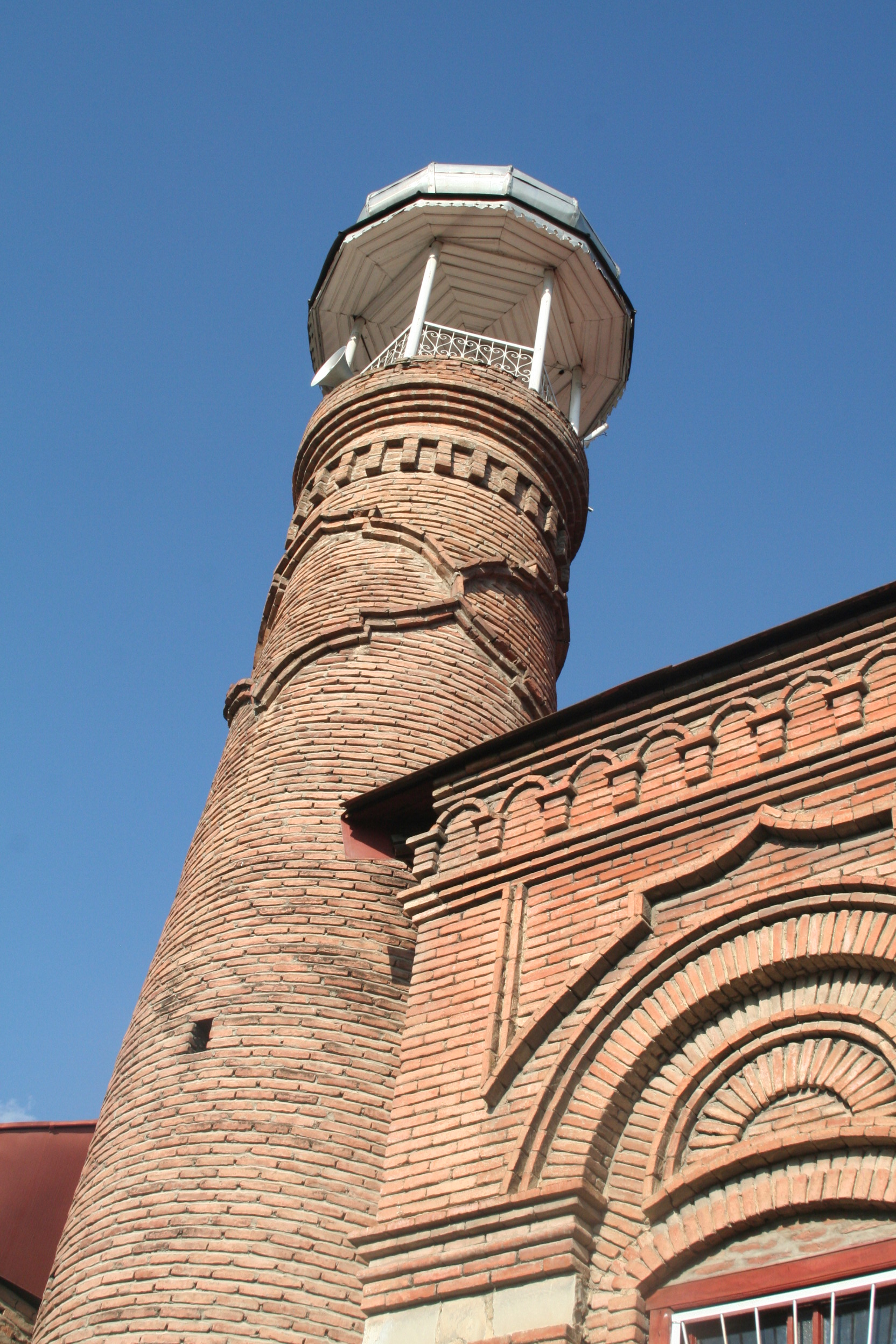

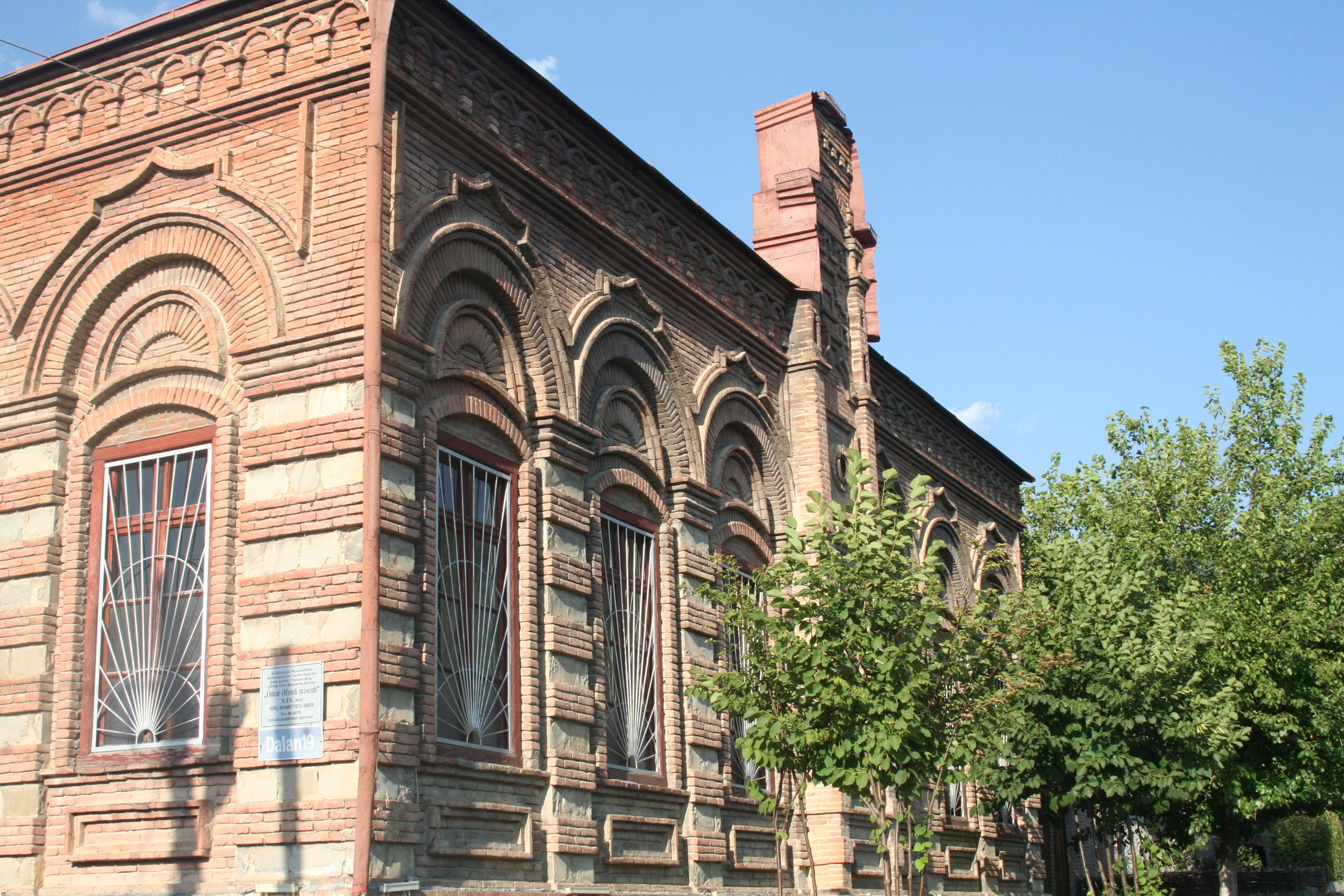

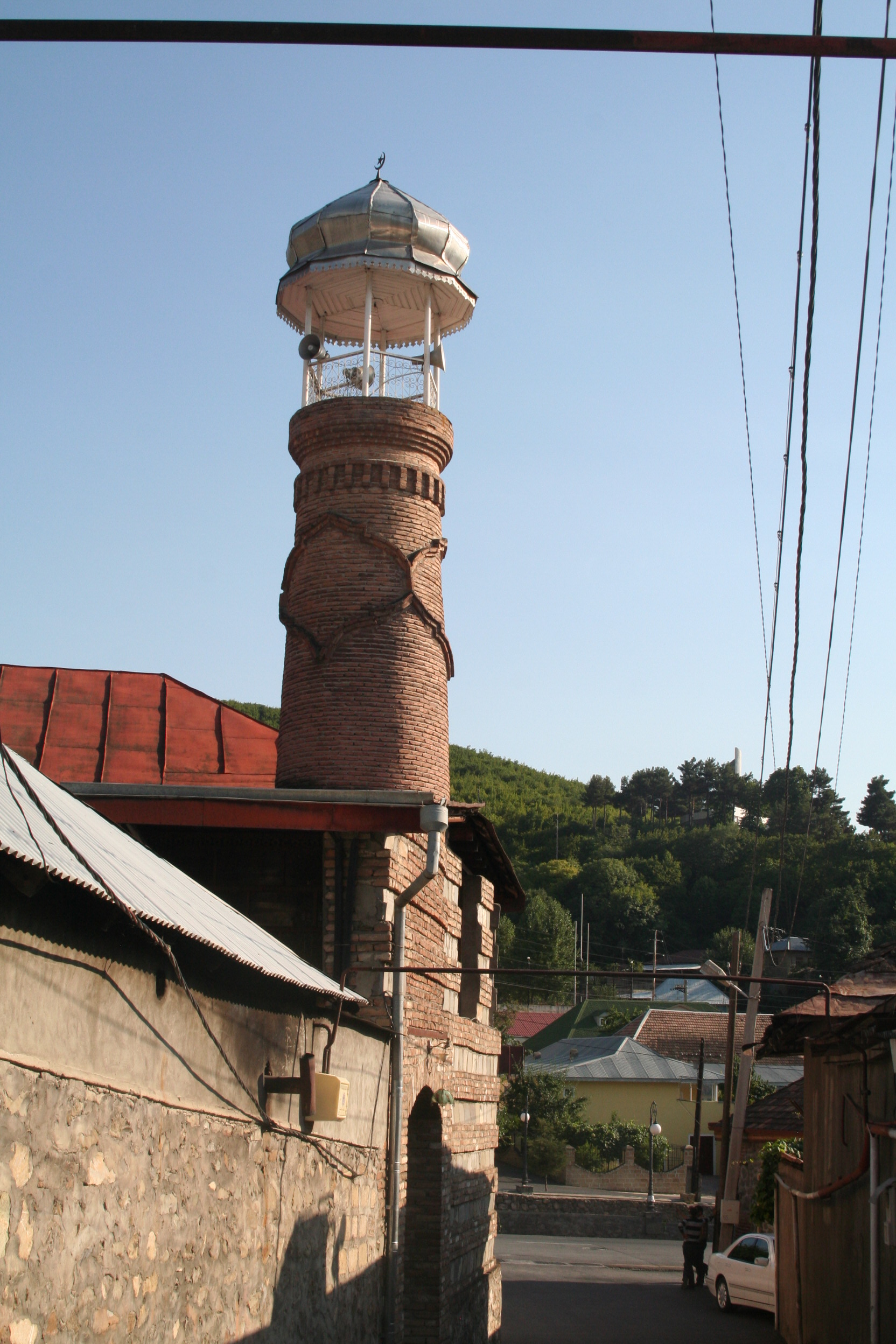

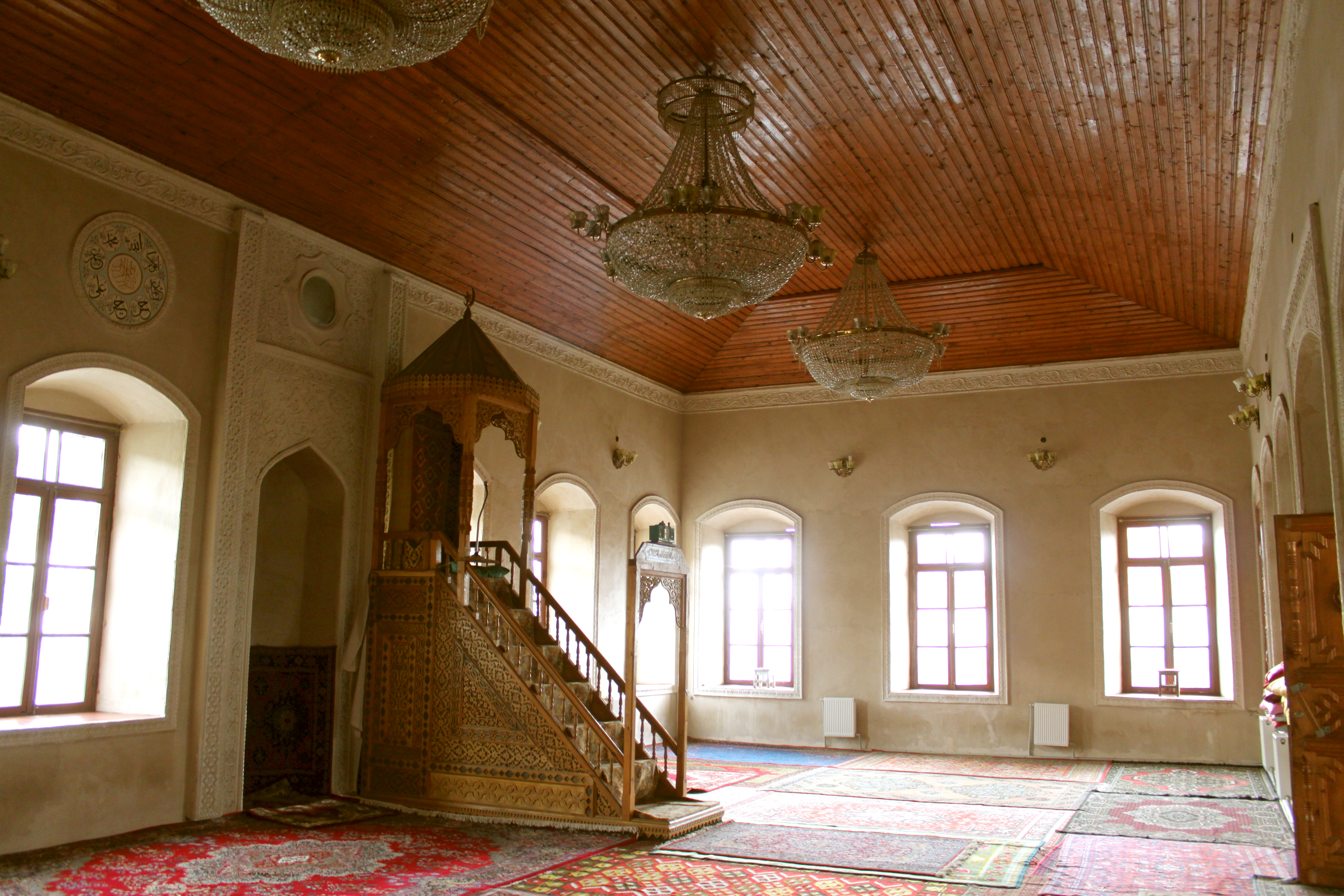

== See also ==
- Islam in Azerbaijan
- List of mosques in Azerbaijan
