= House of Ismayil Huseynbayov =

Coordinates: 41°12′14″N 47°11′58″E

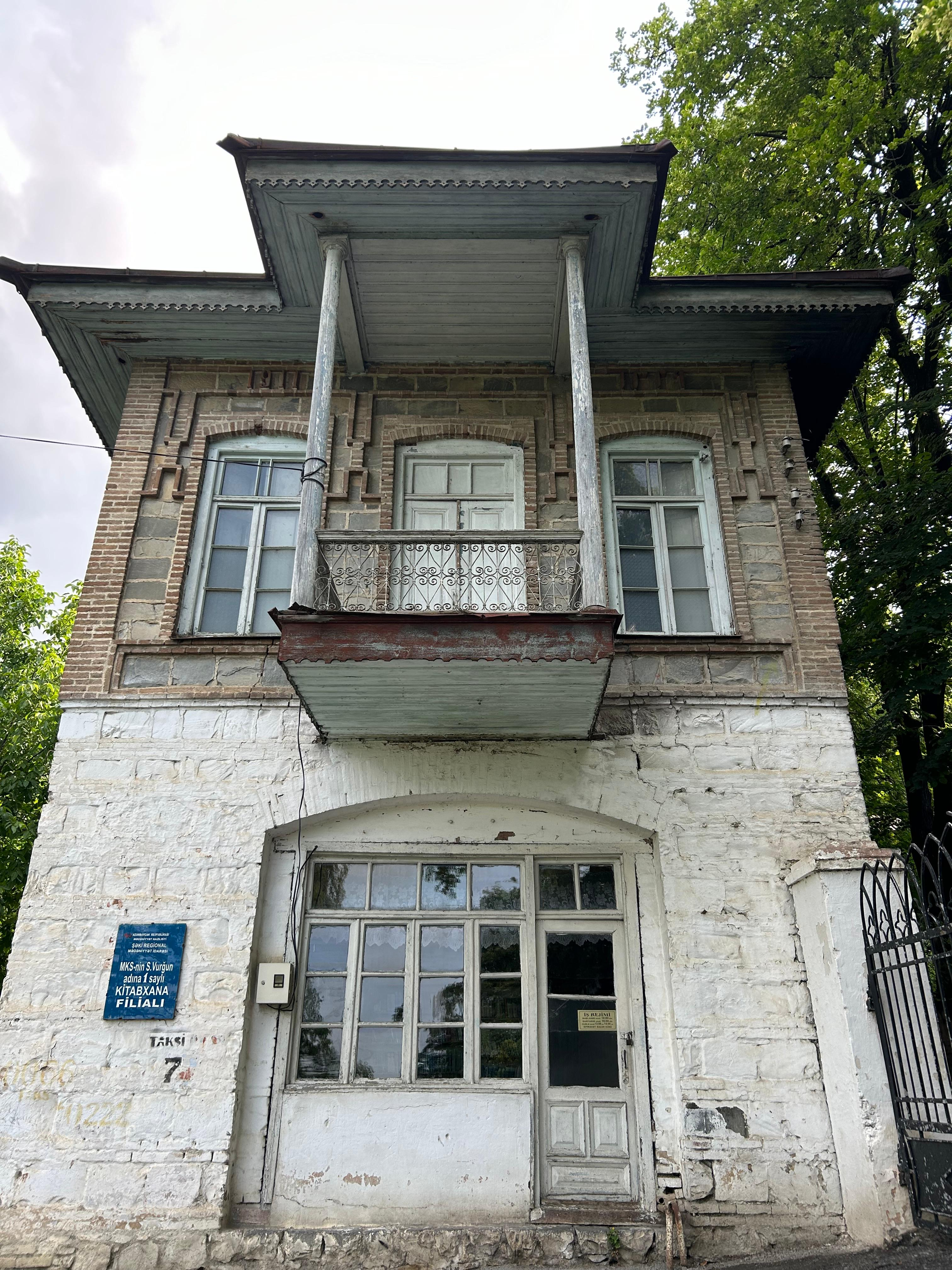
- Location: M. F. Akhundzadeh Avenue, 4
- Area: Shaki, Azerbaijan
- Built: 1911

The House of Ismayil Huseynbayov is a historical and architectural monument dating back to 1911, located in the city of Shaki, Azerbaijan.

The building was included in the list of immovable historical and cultural monuments of local importance by decision No. 338 of the Cabinet of Azerbaijan, dated 3 November 2021.

== About ==
The house of Ismayıl Huseynbayov was built in 1911. After the Soviet occupation, the building was confiscated.

Since 2001, the historical part of Shaki, where the building is located, was nominated for the UNESCO World Heritage List. On 7 July 2019, "The Historic Centre of Shaki with the Khan’s Palace" was inscribed on the UNESCO World Heritage List. The decision was adopted at the 43rd session of the UNESCO World Heritage Committee, held at the Baku Congress Center.

The building was included in the list of immovable historical and cultural monuments of local importance by decision No. 338 of the Cabinet of Ministers of the Republic of Azerbaijan, dated 3 November 2021.

Currently, two rooms on the first floor of the building house a branch of Library No. 1 named after Samad Vurghun.

=== Architecture ===
Built in the national architectural style, the building is located on the left bank of the Gurjana River and constructed from baked bricks and river stones. Its total area is 227.3 square meters. The construction date is engraved in baked brick above the right window on the front facade. One of the balconies is located on the front facade, while the other is on the side facade. The balconies are supported by round-section, carved wooden columns with capitals and bases. The spaces between the columns are filled with metal railings, topped with wooden balustrades. The two-story building consists of six adjacent rooms. In winter, wall stoves were used to heat the rooms.

== Sources ==
=== Literature ===
- Mirzəliyeva, Sevil (2025). Tarixin izlərini günümüzə daşıyan memarlıq inciləri (Zülfüqarovların mülkləri) (PDF) (in Azerbaijani). Bakı: SCIENTIFIC WORK International Scientific Journal. p. 181. ISSN 2663-4619.
