= INMerge Innovation Summit =

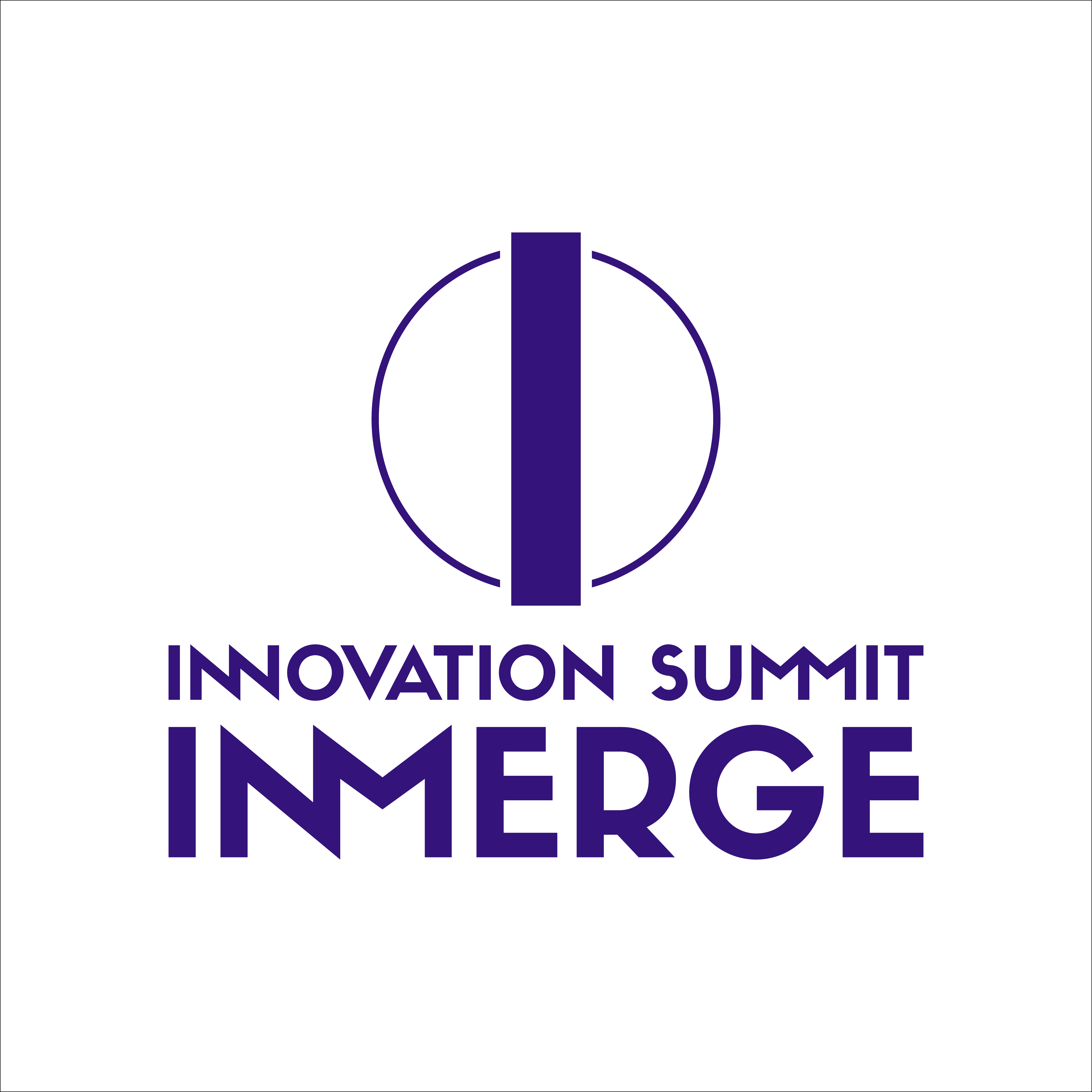
- INMerge Innovation Summit Logo
- Venue: Baku Convention Center
- Location: Baku
- Countries: Azerbaijan, Uzbekistan, Kazakhstan
- Years active: 2021- present
- Attendance: 5000
- Website: https://www.inmerge.az

The INMerge Innovation Summit is an annual technology and innovation conference held in Baku, Azerbaijan. The event focuses on startups, investment, and digital transformation in the wider Eurasian region.

== History ==
The summit was first held in Baku in 2021 and has taken place annually at the Baku Convention Center. The 2024 edition was held on 10–11 October 2024, followed by the 2025 event on 29–30 September 2025. The event is organized by PASHA Holding and supported by local and regional partners.

== Format ==
The summit takes place over two days and includes keynote speeches, panel discussions, and workshops. Sessions cover themes such as fintech, artificial intelligence, telecommunications, marketing, e-commerce, investment, and industry 4.0. The program also features INBattle, a startup pitch competition involving around 40 companies. One of the goals is to bridge relations between Europe, Azerbaijan, the Caucasus, and Central Asia.

== Participation ==
The 2025 edition hosted more than 5,000 participants, 150 speakers, 100 startups, and over 80 venture funds. Participants include startup founders, investors, corporate representatives, and policymakers from Azerbaijan and neighboring countries.

== Speakers ==
Speakers at the 2025 summit included Ed Catmull, co-founder of Pixar and former president of Walt Disney Animation Studios; Marc Randolph, co-founder and first chief executive officer of Netflix; and Zack Kass, former head of go to market at OpenAI. Academic participants included Hal Gregersen of the MIT Leadership Center and Tarun Khanna of Harvard Business School.

== Regional activities ==
In addition to the main event in Baku, INMerge holds regional roadshows and startup events in countries such as Turkey Kazakhstan and Uzbekistan. These side events include pitch competitions and networking sessions with local innovation centers such as in Georgia. In 2026 the event took place for the first time in Europe in Berlin, Germany.
