= Dadanov's property =

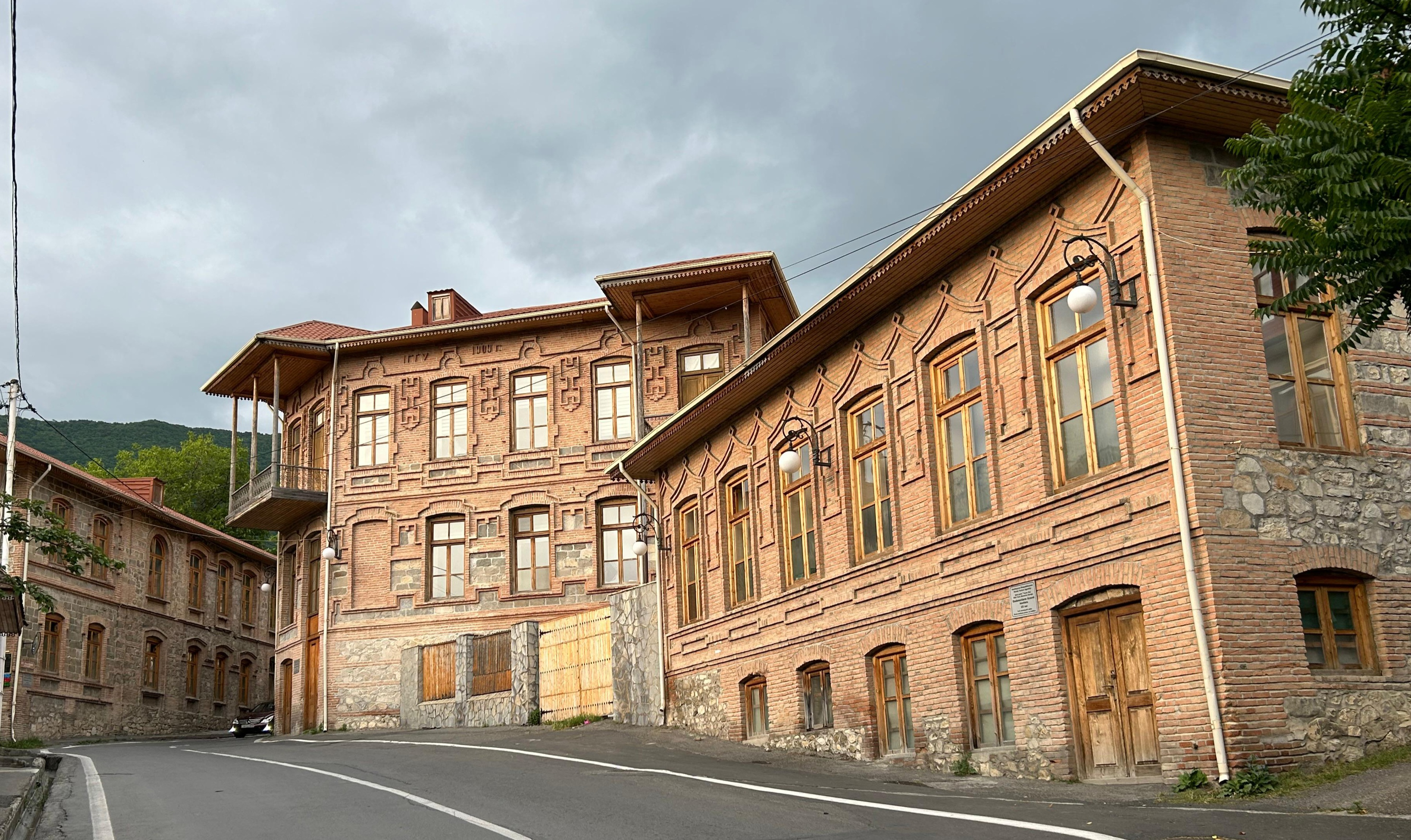
- Interactive map of Dadanov's property
- Location: Mirza Fatali Akhundzadeh Avenue, 164
- Coordinates: 41.2013°N 47.1952°E
- Area: Shaki, Azerbaijan
- Built: Early 20th century

Dadanov's property — historical and architectural monuments located in the city of Shaki, built by the Dadanovs.

The five buildings in the area were included in the list of immovable historical and cultural monuments of local significance by Decision No. 338 of the Cabinet of Ministers of the Republic of Azerbaijan dated November 3, 2021.

== About ==
The Dadanov's property consist of five buildings — four located on the eastern side of the present-day M.F. Akhundzade Avenue and one on the western side. It is assumed that the buildings were constructed in the early 20th century. Only the third building bears a construction date, which is recorded as 1909. The buildings were commissioned by the Dadanovs. Haji Hasan Dadanov was engaged in the export of tobacco and makhorka (a type of coarse tobacco). After him, his sons continued the business. One of them, Khalil Dadanov, completed his secondary education and pursued higher education in Saint Petersburg. Upon returning to Shaki, he married Tukazban, the daughter of Haji Muhammad Sadiq Aliyev.

Since 2001, the historic part of Shaki, where the building is located, was nominated for inclusion in the UNESCO World Heritage List. On July 7, 2019, “The Historic Centre of Shaki with the Khan’s Palace” was inscribed on the UNESCO World Heritage List. The decision was adopted at the 43rd session of the UNESCO World Heritage Committee held at the Baku Congress Center.

The five buildings in the area were included in the list of immovable historical and cultural monuments of local significance by Decision No. 338 of the Cabinet of Azerbaijan dated November 3, 2021. Three of them were registered under the name “The Dadanov's property” and two under “The Dadanov's Trade Office.”

Currently, these buildings house the Shaki City Boarding Gymnasium for Integrated Education.

=== Architecture ===
The architect of the buildings is master Rza Qafarov. River stone, red brick, lime, and forest wood were used in their construction.

There are a total of 39 rooms in the buildings of the complex. The total area of the first building is 760 square meters. This building, which was used as a tobacco makhorka factory, has three floors and consists of seven rooms. Currently, the first floor is used as a warehouse, while the second and third floors are used as classrooms. The total area of the second building is 763 square meters. It has three floors and twelve rooms. The total area of the third building is 218 square meters. This building is used as a dormitory and consists of three rooms. The total area of the fourth building is 392 square meters. This two-story building has seven rooms.

== Pictures ==
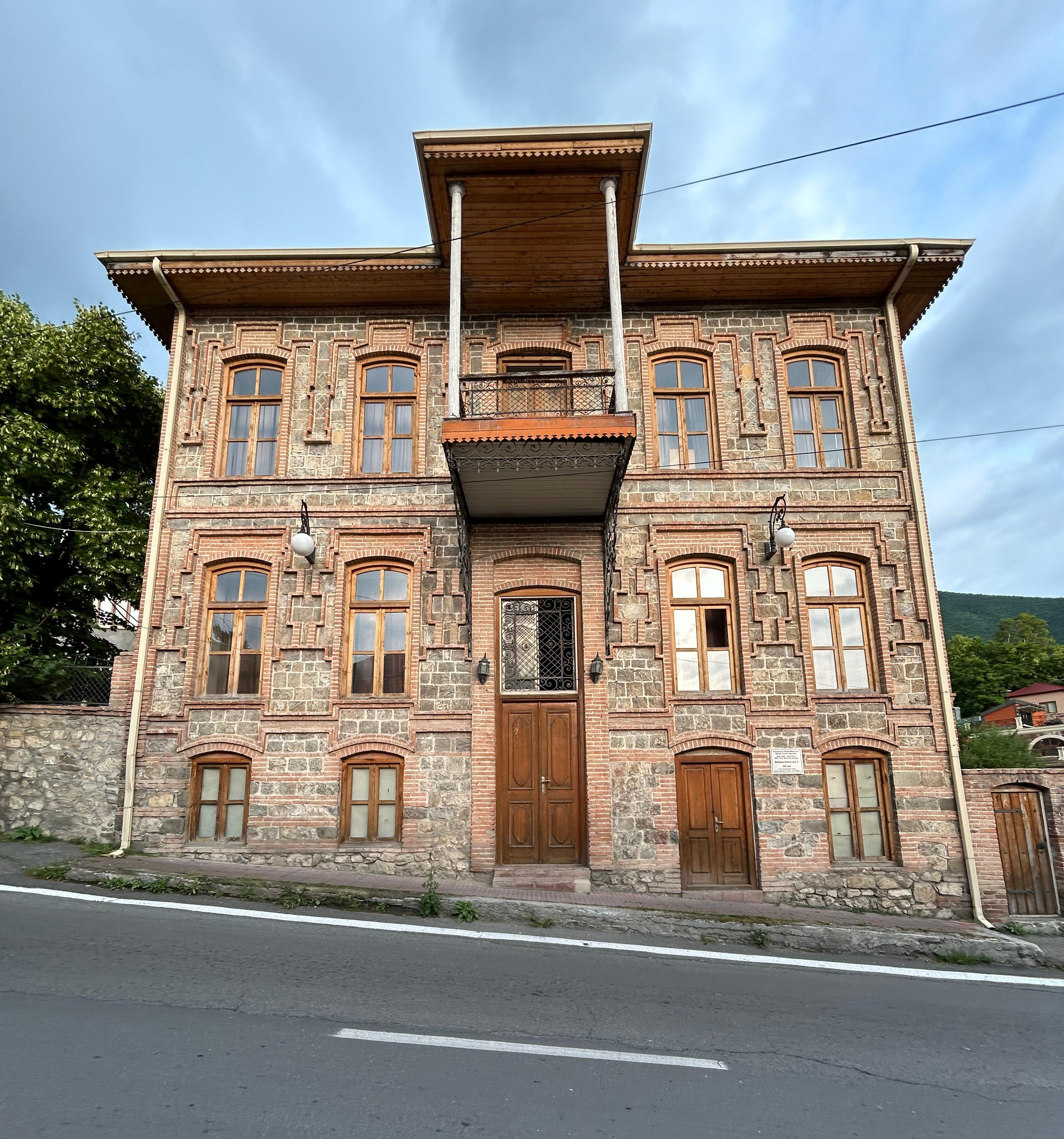
The Dadanov's property 1

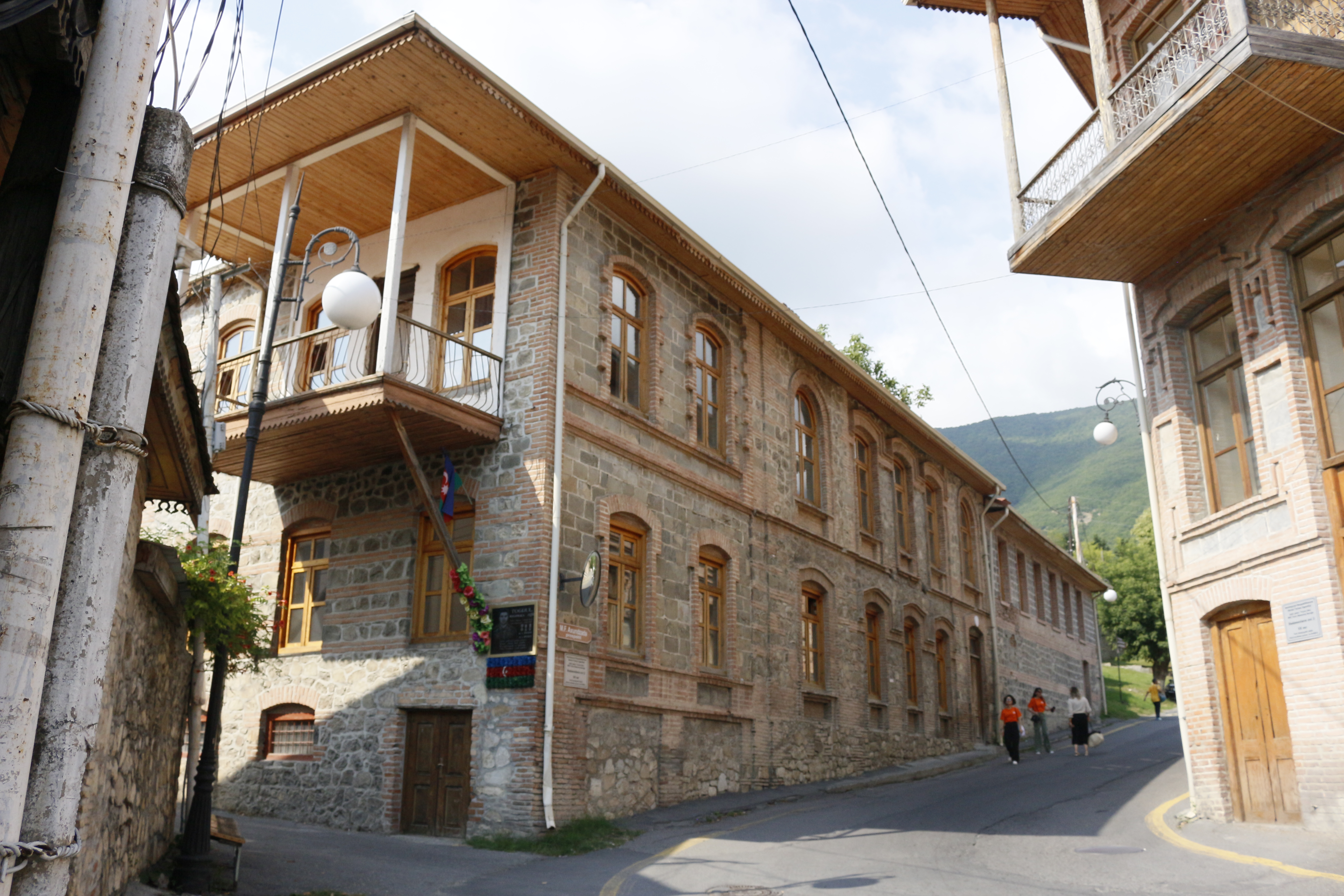
The Dadanov's property 2

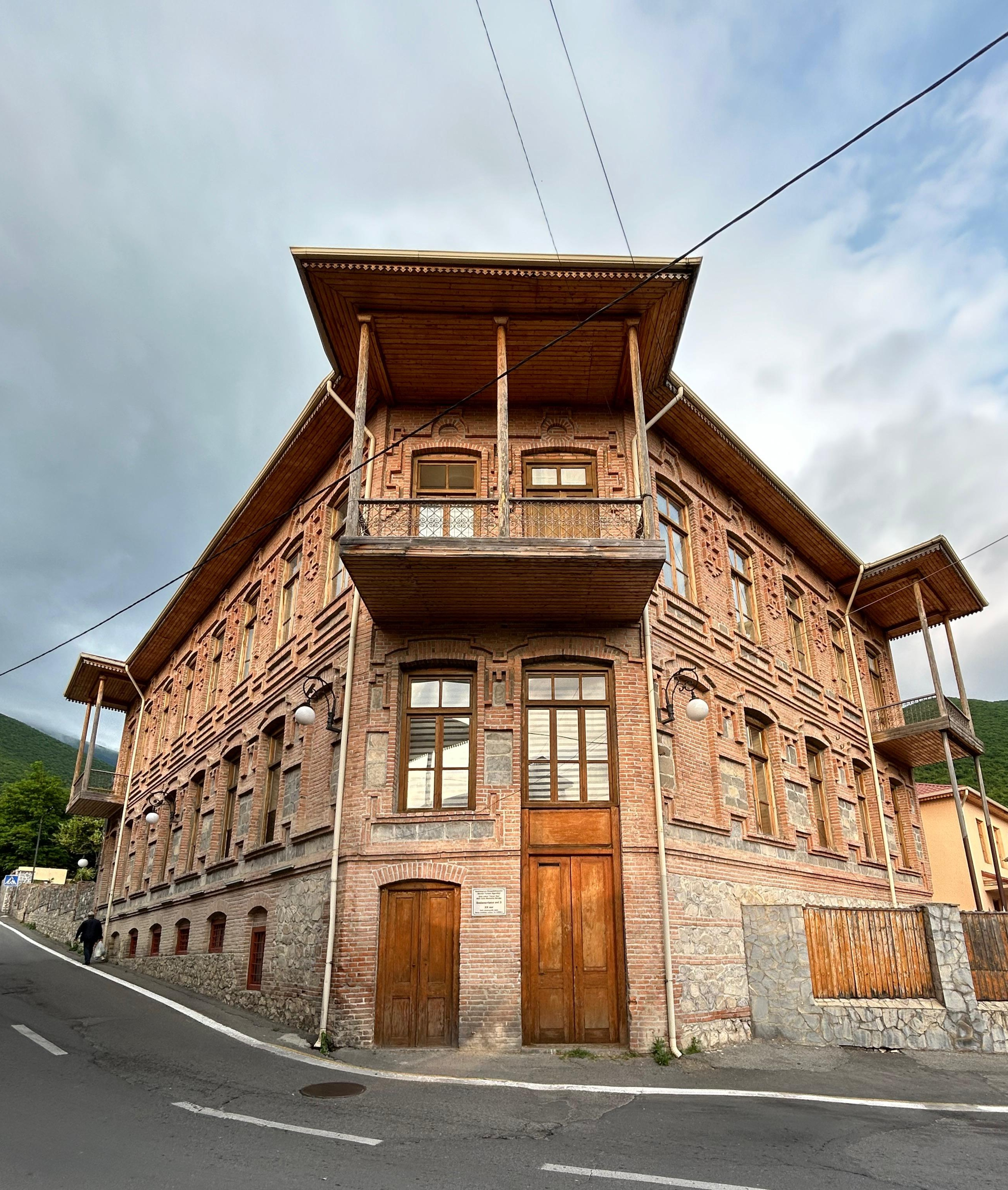
The Dadanov's property 3

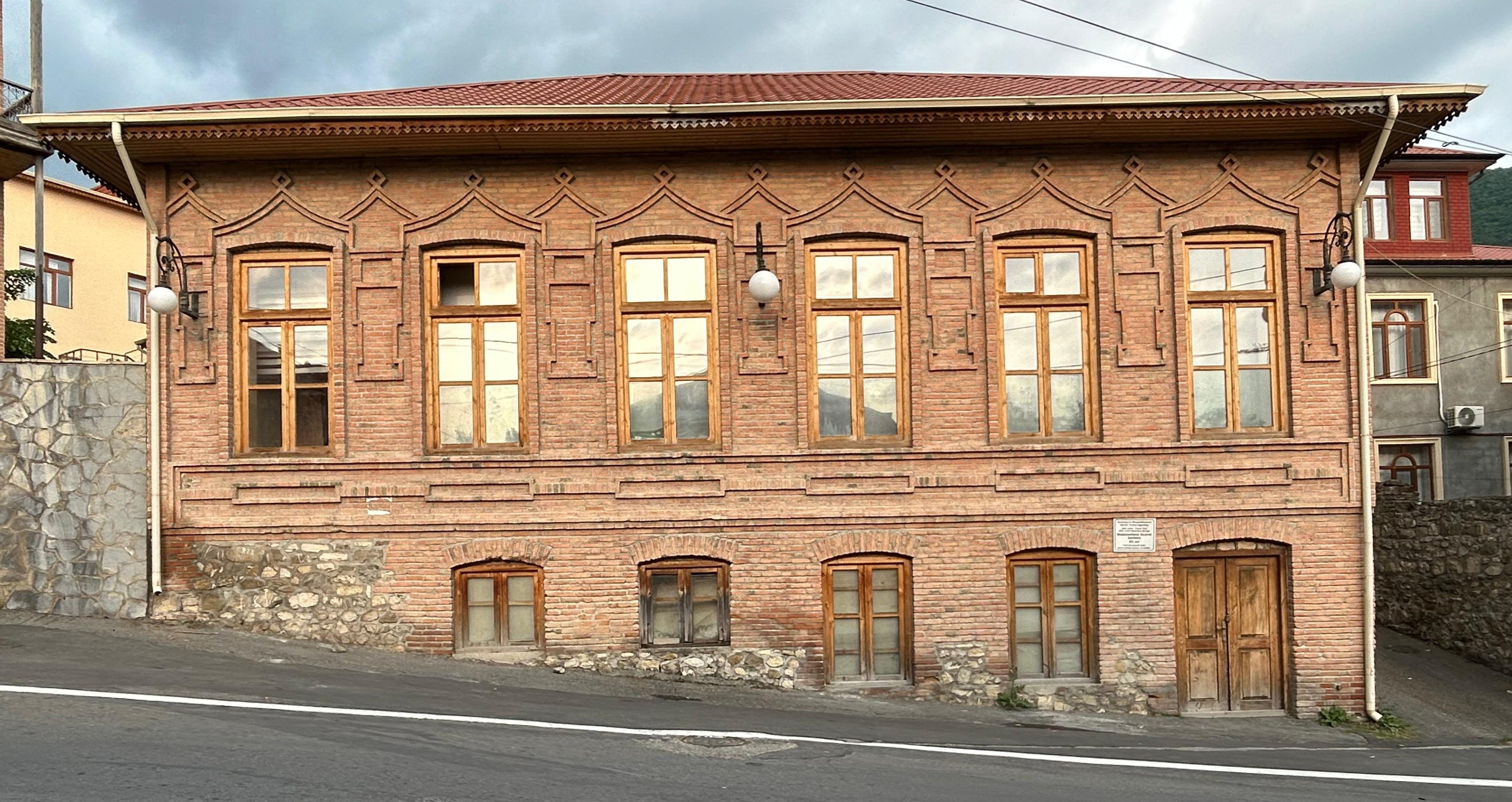
The Dadanov's Trade Office 1
