= PASHA Holding =

Azerbaijani conglomerate

PASHA Holding LLC
- Type: Private company
- Industry: Financial services
- Founded: 2006
- Headquarters: Baku, Azerbaijan
- Area served: Azerbaijan; Turkey; Georgia; Montenegro
- Key people: Jalal Gasimov, CEO
- Services: Banking; Insurance; Investment and brokerage; Construction; Travel and tourism; Hospitality; Technology; Ecosystems; Property development, Agriculture, Retail Grocery, Entertainment, Fashion, Restaurant Business
- Revenue: ▲AZN 5.12 billion (2025)
- Total assets: ▲AZN 23.3 billion (2024)
- Total equity: ▲AZN 2.98 billion (2024)
- Number of employees: 25.000+ (2025)
- Website: http://www.pasha-holding.az

PASHA Holding is an Azerbaijani conglomerate. Its major holdings are Kapital Bank (81.08%) and Pasha Bank (71.7498%). The revenue in 2025 was 3.1 billion US-Dollars.

It has more than 25,000 employees and total assets of 17.9 billion US-Dollars. The conglomerate is active in Azerbaijan, Uzbekistan, Turkey, Georgia, Montenegro, and the United States.

== Ownership and Criticism ==
PASHA Holding is owned by the Aliyev and Pashayev families in Azerbaijan, two of the most powerful families in the country, making it one of the most powerful companies in the country. The ultimate shareholders of the company are Pashayev and the first daughters of Azerbaijan's president, Ilham Aliyev, Leyla and Arzu. Mehriban Aliyeva is not involved in the business.

Pasha Holding was founded by Arif Pashayev, the father of Mehriban Aliyeva (née Pashayeva), the first lady of Azerbaijan.

The company has been embroiled in high-level corruption in Azerbaijan. The company has substantial government contracts across different sectors.

== Subsidiaries ==
Among its subsidiaries are:

- Pasha Real Estate Group
- Pasha Life
- Pasha Insurance
- Pasha Bank Azerbaijan
- Pasha Bank Georgia
- Pasha Bank Türkiye
- Pasha Capital
- Bir Ecosystem (Birbank, Birmarket, Pashapay)
- Bravo
- AgroDairy
- Pasha Technology
- Pasha Ventures Group

The company operates in Azerbaijan, Turkey, Montenegro, Uzbekistan, and Georgia. Pasha Holding owns a 50% stake in the Mandarin Oriental Bodrum Hotel. In 2024, Pasha Construction invested 200 million US$ in building a Ritz-Carlton hotel in Tashkent, Uzbekistan. In June 2024, Pasha Holding announced a possible IPO in 2025 at the Azerbaijani Stock Exchange, with a possible double listing in Dubai or Turkey.

The company's investments are primarily focused on its home region, with any remaining funds allocated to the United States and Germany. Pasha Holding has considered establishing a branch in Germany. In similar cases it typically conducts one or two pilot investments, as it did in the United States. Its core business is real estate, and it may also implement pilot projects in the German real estate sector with an investment volume of three to five million Euros. Recently an investment in Hudson Valley, USA, was made.

=== Pasha Real Estate Group ===
Pasha Real Estate Group, is active as a real estate investor and developer in the White City of Baku, among other places. One example of this is the Knightsbridge Residence, which was designed by Chapman Taylor and implemented by Pasha Real Estate. Recently an investment in Hudson Valley, USA, was made.

=== Pasha Bank ===
Pasha Bank operates in Azerbaijan, Georgia, and Turkey. It is the largest bank in Azerbaijan. In June 2026, a total of five percent of its total assets were listed on the Baku Stock Exchange. The lead underwriters are Pasha Capital AB, ABB Invest, and Unicapital. This marks the first initial public offering (IPO) of a private company in Azerbaijan.

== Activities ==
The company built the Four Seasons hotel in Baku, which involved destroying part of the Baku Fortress Wall of the Inner City.

Critics like Transparency International have pointed out that Pasha Holding, a COP 29 "official partner", has close ties to the Aliyev family.

Between 2023 and 2025, Pasha Holding supported the restoration of the historic Chol Gala Mosque in Shusha.

Pasha Holding has been partnering with the Baku International Jazz Festival for more than ten years.

In addition, Pasha Holding organizes the InMerge Innovation Summit which is held annually in Baku as well as Türkiye, Kazakhstan, Uzbekistan, Georgia, and Germany.

It has been sponsoring the UFC in Baku. In June 2026 Pasha Holding started the establishment of IE University in Baku.
