= IT Park Uzbekistan =

Technology hub in Uzbekistan

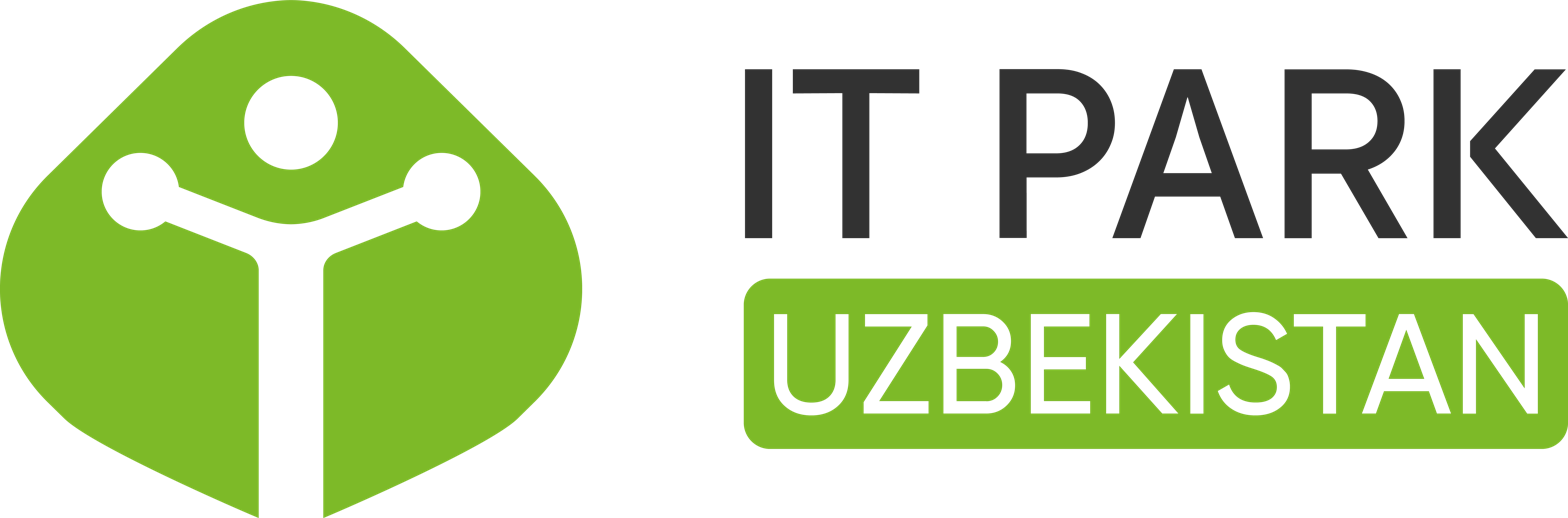
- Formation: July 24, 2019; 7 years ago
- Founder: Ministry of Digital Technologies of the Republic of Uzbekistan
- Type: Technological Park
- Headquarters: Tashkent, Uzbekistan
- Key people: Farkhod Ibragimov (Chairman of the Supervisory Board); Azamat Karamatov (CEO)
- Website: outsource.gov.uz/en

IT Park Uzbekistan is a government-supported technology hub in Uzbekistan, established in 2019 under the supervision of the Ministry of Digital Technologies of the Republic of Uzbekistan. The organization aims to make Uzbekistan a global IT hub by supporting startups, IT companies, and digital service exporters.

== Establishment ==
IT Park was established under the initiative of President Shavkat Mirziyoyev to strengthen the startup ecosystem and support innovative projects in Uzbekistan. It was officially launched on January 10, 2019, following the adoption of the Resolution of the Cabinet of Ministers of the Republic of Uzbekistan No. 17 "On Measures to Create a Technological Park of Software Products and Information Technologies." First building of IT Park Uzbekistan opened its doors on July 24, 2019. On November 20, 2019, President Mirziyoyev visited the IT Park and laid a symbolic foundation stone for its next phase of development.

== Overview ==
IT Park Uzbekistan is a state-backed initiative aimed at developing the country's IT sector and positioning Uzbekistan as a regional technology hub. Established to support the growth of the digital economy, IT Park Uzbekistan provides infrastructure, tax incentives, and regulatory support to IT companies operating in the country. The initiative focuses on expanding IT exports, scaling local startups to an international level, increasing the number of member companies, and creating employment opportunities within the sector.

== Leadership ==
The IT Park Uzbekistan team is led by:

- Farkhod Ibragimov – Chairman of Supervisory Board
- Azamat Karamatov – Chief Executive Officer (CEO)
- Jakhongir Rajabov – First Deputy Executive Director
- Lazizbek Xudaev – Deputy Executive Director for Work with Members
- Makhliyo Muksinova – Deputy Executive Director for Strategic Development
- Miralimova Dilafruz - Deputy Executive Director for Inclusive Development
- Azam Abdullaev - Deputy Executive Director for Regional Development

== Key support programs ==
IT Park serves as an authorized entity responsible for delivering government-initiated support programs designed specifically for its members.

=== 0% Tax ===
Members of IT Park Uzbekistan are eligible for tax incentives, including exemptions from corporate and personal income taxes, VAT, and customs duties until 2040. These measures are designed to lower operational costs and attract both local and international companies.

=== Zero Risk ===
This program mitigates risks for foreign investors by providing support for establishing operations in Uzbekistan, including free office space for 12 months, followed by rental at average market rates or with a purchase option with interest-free installments; free technical equipment for up to 100 employees and partial coverage of HR costs. Wage reimbursements are offered based on company size: 5% for companies with 20–50 employees, 10% for companies with 50–75 employees; 15% for companies with 76 or more employees. IT Park also offers training and recruitment support with up to 50% reimbursement of expenses, capped at 200 base units.

=== Local2Global ===
Local2Global" is a program aimed at fostering the development of the IT industry in the regions of Uzbekistan, creating high-value jobs and modern professions for local populations, and attracting companies engaged in IT services export — while empowering residents of IT Park to access international markets and scale their business globally.

=== IT Visa ===
The IT Visa program grants a multiple-entry visa for up to three years, with the possibility of extension upon the applicant's request without requiring them to leave the territory of the Republic of Uzbekistan. Visa holders can access education and medical services under the same conditions as citizens of Uzbekistan, reside in any region without the obligation to re-register their place of residence, and acquire real estate of any value. The program is available to foreign investors, IT specialists, founders (participants) of member companies, foreign professors (Candidate of Sciences, PhD, DSc) in the field of information technologies, individuals acting as the sole executive body or chairperson of the collegial executive body of member companies, as well as their deputies, founders (participants), and specialists of startup projects. These conditions also extend to the family members of IT Visa holders.

=== Softlanding ===
The Softlanding program facilitates the entry and growth of international companies within Uzbekistan's IT ecosystem by providing access to skilled talent in BPO and IT sectors, priority access to infrastructure, legal, financial, accounting and banking support, simplified IT Visa, assistance with business registration through a one-stop shop, securing office locations, support with accommodation and relocation and guidance on forming strategic partnerships and growth opportunities.

== Infrastructure ==
IT Park Uzbekistan operates 14 branches nationwide. Infrastructure includes facilities for the needs of startups, established enterprises, and educational initiatives. The Tashkent headquarters is a flagship hub that covers six hectares and includes co-working spaces, conference centers, and innovation labs.

Additionally, IT Park has 6 representative offices abroad:

- Delaware, USA
- Heidelberg, Germany
- Seoul, South Korea
- Riyadh, Saudi Arabia
- Tokyo, Japan
- Shanghai, China

In 2024, Ministry of Digital Technologies of the Republic of Uzbekistan, IT Park Uzbekistan and DataVolt entered into an agreement to build on the territory of IT Park Complex the high-capacity green data-centers worth $5B, sponsored by DataVolt.

== Educational initiatives ==
=== IT Park University ===
IT Park University (ITPU) was established by EPAM Systems in partnership with IT Park under the Ministry of Digital Technologies of Uzbekistan. The university focuses on training IT specialists through programs led by industry experts. Students gain hands-on experience by working on real projects and participating in internships, including opportunities abroad. The curriculum is updated annually to align with the industry trends and requirements.

== Startup ecosystem ==
The IT Park Uzbekistan database currently includes more than 1,500 active startups, which have collectively raised over $300 million in investment. IT Park collaborates with various organizations to advance the country's innovation ecosystem. IT Park Uzbekistan joined forces with Astana Hub to form the Central Asian Innovation Hubs, an alliance aimed at growing the region's startup ecosystem and potential on the global level. Through its partnership with the global accelerator Plug and Play, IT Park Uzbekistan connects startups directly with international investors, corporate partners, and global market opportunities.

More than 30 startups have been showcased under a unified brand at major international conferences, including WebSummit Lisbon, INMerge, and TechCrunch.

IT Park Uzbekistan also participates in major international technology, innovation, and startup ecosystem events, including:

- Web Summit (Lisbon, Portugal) – the world's largest technology conference, uniting over 70,000 participants.
- TechCrunch Disrupt (San Francisco, USA) – a leading startup conference showcasing the latest technologies.
- GITEX Global (Dubai, UAE) – one of the largest tech exhibitions in the Middle East.
- Go Tech (Bucharest, Romania) – the largest B2B expo-conference for IT and digital solutions in the Central and Eastern Europe region
- Call & Contact Centre Expo London (London, UK) – Europe's leading event for call and contact center professionals, showcasing the latest innovations in customer experience technology.
- Dubai Fintech Summit (Dubai, UAE) – a global event focused on the latest innovations in financial technology.
- NEXUS-2024 (Orlando, USA) – international summit connecting private equity leaders and institutional investors, facilitating discussions on macroeconomic trends, fundraising strategies, and investment opportunities.

=== Competitions and incubation ===
IT Park Uzbekistan organizes annual competitions, such as President Tech Award with a $1M prize fund, to identify and nurture promising startups. Winners receive funding, mentorship, and access to incubation facilities.

=== Acceleration programs ===
Startups participate in structured programs providing business development training, market validation, and exposure to investors. Collaborative branding with organizations like Astana Hub enhances their global visibility and appeal.

=== TumarisTech Central Asia ===
TumarisTech Central Asia, launched in 2019, offers two acceleration programs, a business analytics school, and community. It is focused on supporting entrepreneurship and women in the technology sector.

=== Plug and Play ===
In 2022, IT Park became a co-founding partner of Plug and Play in Uzbekistan, an office connecting Asia and Europe.

=== Partnerships with Alchemist Accelerator, Draper University ===
IT Park has signed 34 agreements with global institutions, including StartX (Stanford), the Legatum Center for Development and Entrepreneurship (MIT), Alchemist Accelerator, and others, to develop international collaboration.

=== Digital Startups Program ===
IT Park is implementing the Digital Startups Program under Presidential Decree No. PP-357, aimed at supporting the startup ecosystem and attracting foreign venture investments. Key initiatives include reimbursing costs for acceleration and incubation, launching a Regulatory Sandbox in 2025, and creating a StartupBase Platform to connect startups, investors, and partners.

== IT Park Ventures ==
IT Park Ventures is a $10 million capital fund focused on supporting early-stage tech startups in Uzbekistan with global potential. The fund provides seed funding and growth capital, access to a network of industry mentors and investors and collaborative opportunities with global partners. It also supports partnerships with international venture capital funds and angel investors, creating co-investment opportunities and expanding the global reach of Uzbek startups.

=== Investments in Startups ===
IT Park Ventures has invested in the following startups:

- Unitlab AI (unitlab.ai) — $200,000
- Geomotive (geomotive.io) — $200,000
- Datatruck (datatruck.io) — $250,000

== Members and economic impact ==
IT Park Uzbekistan is one of the largest tech parks in Central Asia. It has 2,800 member companies. Sectors include IT service (1,506 companies), service providers (425 companies), game development (33 companies), creative (102 companies) and education (534 companies). Members include EPAM (USA), iTransition (UK), Vention (USA, Cyprus), TerraLink (Canada), Dyninno (USA), MightyCall (USA), and Wyn Enterprise (USA, Netherlands).

Exports geography covers 90 countries worldwide, with IT exports primarily going to North America (46%), followed by the CIS (13%) and APAC regions (11%), Europe and the UK (25%), and MENA (5%).

The main export is IT services (53%), GameDev and Creative Economy (11%), software products (8%) and BPO-services (28%).

By the end of 2024, IT Park employed 38,600 people, a 146% increase from the end of 2023, with regional employment surging by 240%, adding over 9,000 jobs.

== Uzbekistan digital inclusion ==
The Uzbekistan Digital Inclusion Project is a joint initiative by the World Bank, the Ministry of Digital Technologies of Uzbekistan, and IT Park. The project focuses on expanding the country’s digital infrastructure, supporting the growth of the IT sector, and increasing access to education and skills development, particularly for socially vulnerable groups and residents of remote areas, in line with the approval of the "Digital Uzbekistan-2030" strategy and measures for its effective implementation. The initiative aimed at expanding access to digital technologies and services, building and upgrading IT infrastructure across the country, and developing IT outsourcing and exports. The project involves the creation of new jobs in IT, with 50% for women and 4% for people with disabilities; training for over 6,200 young professionals aged 18–30, as well as establishment and modernization of IT centers, involving 200+ local and international companies.

== Strategy ==
Uzbekistan is determined to become a global IT hub. The country's goals include reaching $5 billion in IT service exports, expanding IT Park membership to 10,000 companies, creating over 300,000 jobs in the sector, and developing 1 million square meters of infrastructure.

IT Park has played a key role in shaping the industry by offering tax incentives, simplified business registration, and modern infrastructure. IT Park plans to focus on artificial intelligence, attracting international companies, supporting the startup ecosystem, developing regional centers of excellence, and fostering innovation to contribute to Uzbekistan’s IT sector growth and global integration.
