= Gregerson =

Gregerson is a surname. Notable people with the surname include:

- Craig Roger Gregerson (born c. 1986), American murderer
- Linda Gregerson (born 1950), American poet
- Luke Gregerson (born 1984), American baseball player
- Mia Gregerson (born 1972), American politician
- Richard O. Gregerson (1932–2017), American politician

== See also ==
- Gregersen, surname
