= Chol Gala Mosque =

Former mosque in Shusha, Azerbaijan

- Azerbaijani: Çöl Qala Məscidi; Persian: مسجد چول گالا
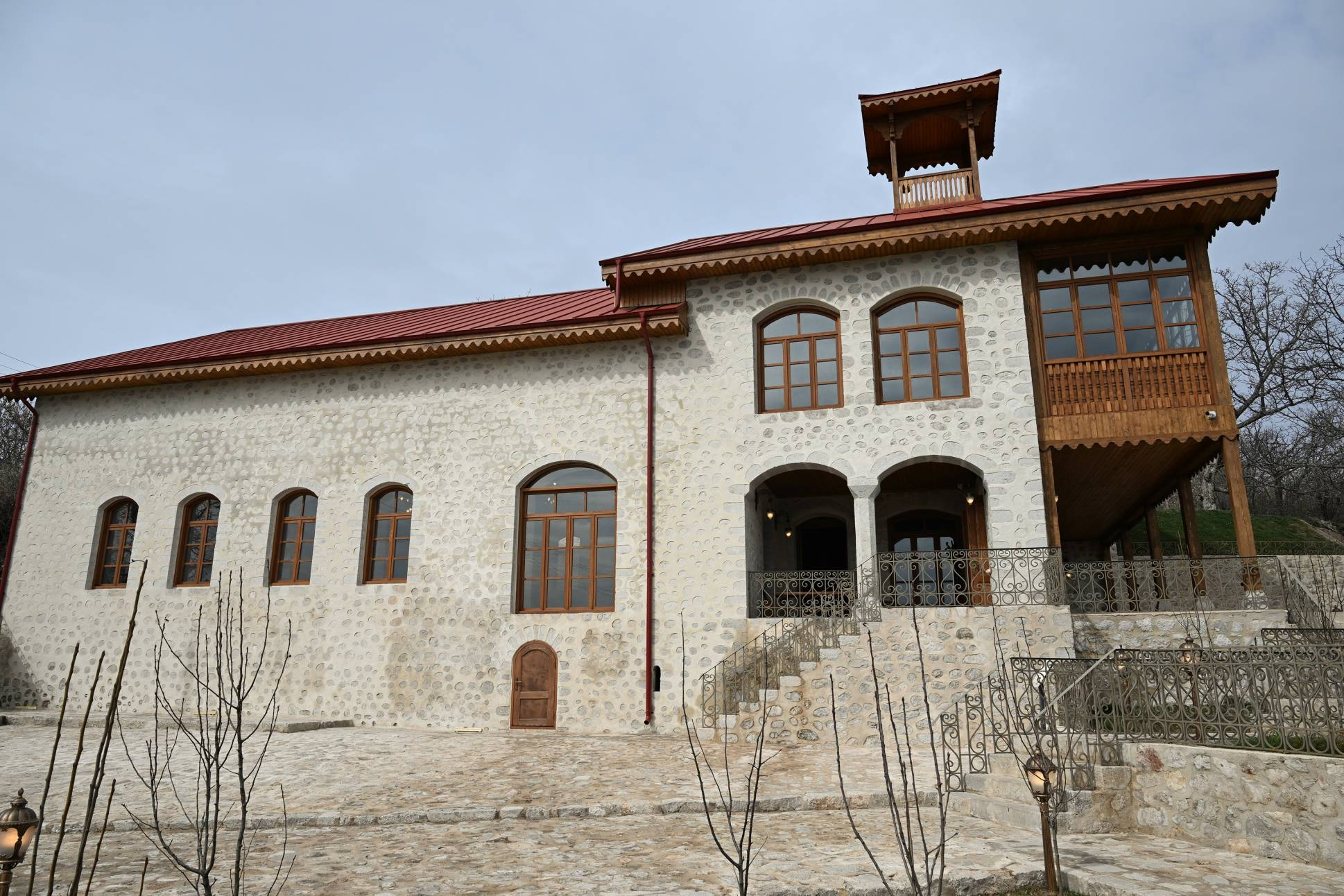

- Location of the mosque in Azerbaijan

Religion
- Affiliation: Shia Islam
- Ecclesiastical or organizational status: Mosque
- Status: Active

Location
- Municipality: Shusha, Shusha District, Karabakh Economic Region
- Country: Azerbaijan
- Interactive map of Chol Gala Mosque
- Coordinates: 39°45′50″N 46°45′09″E

Architecture
- Type: Mosque architecture
- Style: Islamic
- Established: 18th century

The Chol Gala Mosque (Azerbaijani: Çöl Qala məscidi, Persian: مسجد چول گالا; sometimes also transliterated as Chol Qala Mosque) is a Shia Islam mosque located in Shusha, in the Karabakh region of Azerbaijan.

== Overview ==
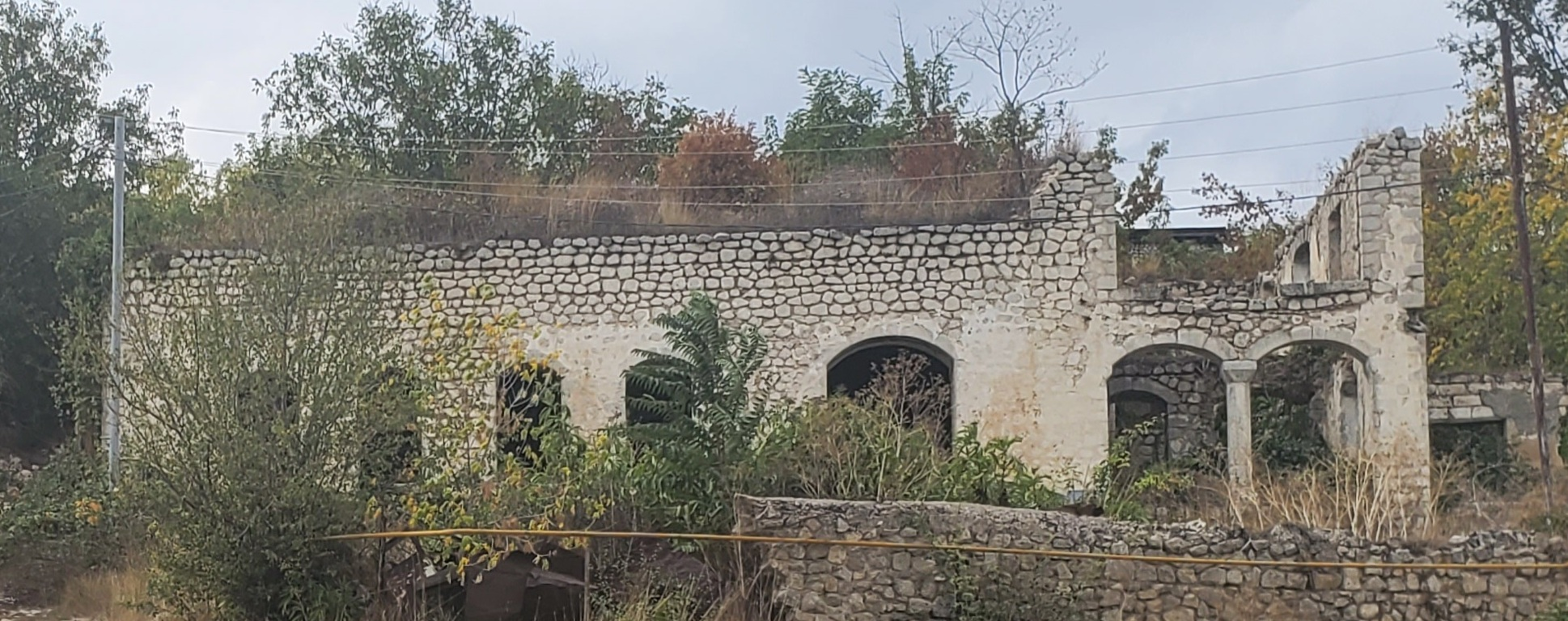
Ruins of the mosque and spring in 2021

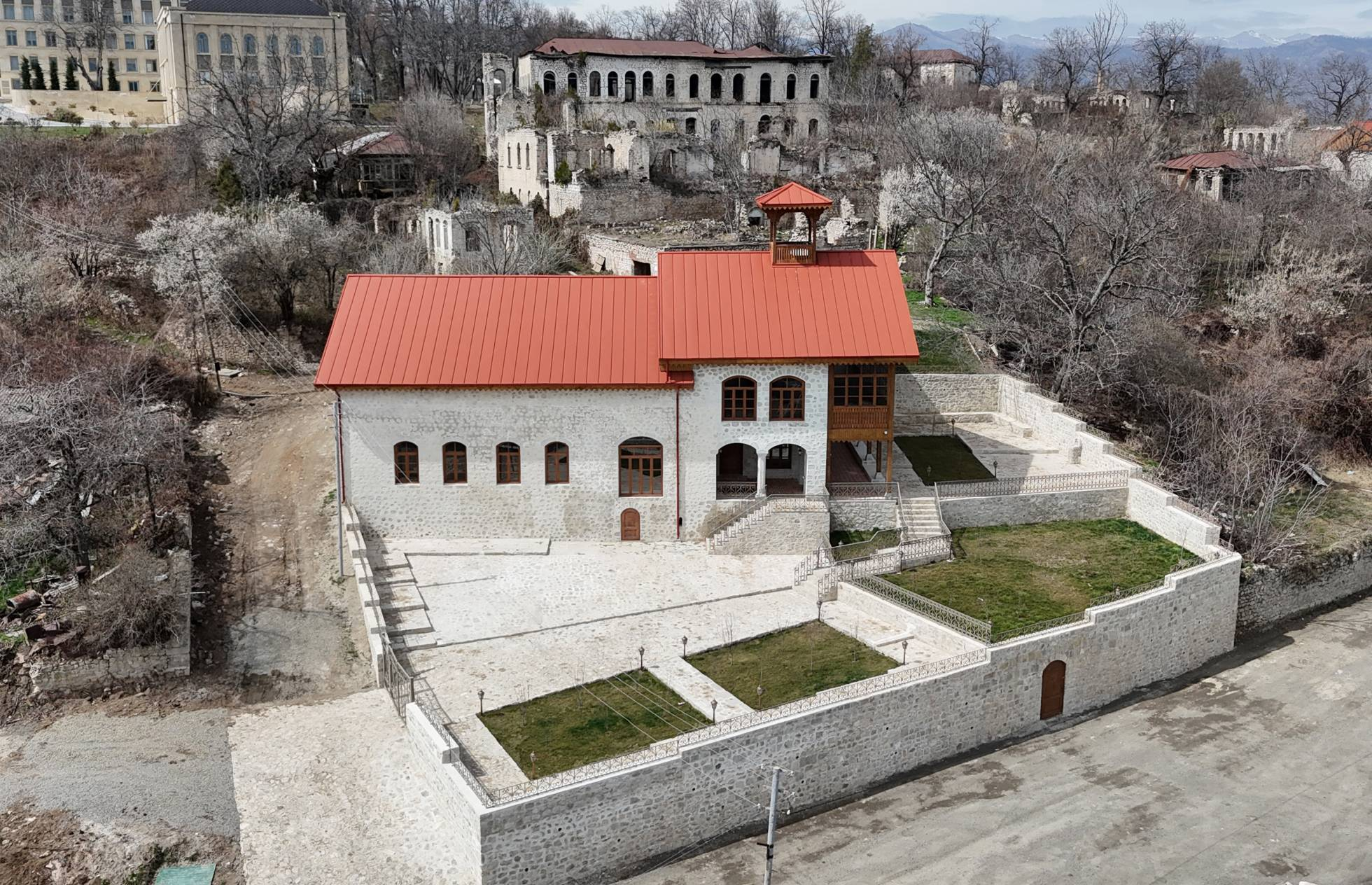
Chol Gala Mosque following restoration efforts in 2025

The former mosque is located on G. Zakir street of the Chol Gala neighborhood of Shusha. The Chol Gala neighbourhood is one of nine lower and earlier neighbourhoods of Shusha. The Chol Gala Mosque was one of the seventeen mosques functioning in Shusha by the end of the 19th century.

There were no minarets and the exterior design of the Chol Gala Mosque followed a rectangular plan neighborhood mosque building, with the interior completely complying with Islamic religious architecture. There was a three-nave prayer hall in the mosque. The Chol Gala spring by the mosque supplied the neighbourhood with mineral water. The former mosque was among the most valuable monuments of the UNESCO World Heritage-listed Shusha State Historical and Architectural Reserve.

== Restoration ==
In 2023, the restoration of Chol Gala Mosque was started, overseen by the Heydar Aliyev Foundation and supported by Pasha Holding. On March 27, President of Azerbaijan Ilham Aliyev and First Lady Mehriban Aliyeva attended the official reopening ceremony of the historic Chol Gala Mosque in Shusha, following a comprehensive restoration process. The event also marked the restoration of the mosque's adjacent spring,

== See also ==
- Shia Islam in Azerbaijan
- List of mosques in Azerbaijan
