= Hans Gregersen =

Danish bioengineer and scientist

Hans Gregersen (born 1962, Denmark) is a Danish bioengineer and scientist. He is regarded as a key figure in the field of gastrointestinal biomechanics and function.

== Biography ==
Gregersen obtained the MD degree from Aarhus University in Denmark in 1988, the PhD degree in physiology in 1994 from Aarhus University and the Master of Public Management degree in strategic leadership from University of Southern Denmark in 1999. He was Director of Research and Innovation at Aalborg Hospital in Denmark from 2001 to 2010 and Executive Director of the Sino-Danish Center for Education and Research (SDC) from 2010 to 2013. Gregersen was professor at the Bioengineering College, Chongqing University in China and in the 1000 Talent Foreign Expert Program of China. He founded the research centre Mech-Sense in 2003, and the GIOME Network in 2013. He was President of the OESO Congress "The Esophagiome" in 2015. Gregersen worked at Chinese University of Hong Kong from 2016-2020. He is currently professor and CEO at the California Medical Innovations Institute (https://calmi2.org/)

== Research ==
Gregersens main fields of research are biomechanics, neurogastroenterology and mechanosensation. Gregersen is the author of numerous books including Essentials of Experimental Surgery, Biomechanics of the Gastrointestinal Tract. and clinical Biomechanics in the gut. He is the principal founder of the GIOME network. Gregersen and colleagues were the first to demonstrate the importance of residual stress on organ mechanical behaviour using a true two layer model and he also supervised the basic work on the luminal functional imaging probe (FLIP) and the multimodal pain testing. Gregersen is the co-inventor of the functional luminal imaging technology (FLIP) that was commercialized by Irish company Crospon Ltd. He is the inventor of the Fecobionics technology for diagnostics at anorectal disorders.

== Principal works ==
- Biomechanics of the Gastrointestinal Tract: New Perspectives in Motility Research and Diagnostics (2002, Springer Verlag)
- Basic and New Aspects of Gastrointestinal Ultrasonography (2005, World Scientific Publishers)
- The zero-stress state of the gastrointestinal tract: biomechanical and functional implications (2000, Gregersen H, Kassab GS, Fung YC)
- Gregersen, Hans; Christensen, James (2005). "Mechanically restricted regional blood flow might explain gastrointestinal pain". Nature Clinical Practice Gastroenterology & Hepatology. 2 (9): 378–9. doi:10.1038/ncpgasthep0255. PMID 16265407. S2CID 23089580.
- Gregersen, H.; Kassab, G. (1996). "Biomechanics of the gastrointestinal tract". Neurogastroenterology & Motility. 8 (4): 277–97. doi:10.1111/j.1365-2982.1996.tb00267.x. PMID 8959733. S2CID 23170373.
- Gregersen H, Christensen J. Clinical Biomechanics in the Gut. An Introduction. Bentham Scientific Publishers.2016. ISBN 978-1-68108-119-9, 978-1-68108-118-2
- Gregersen H, Chen SC, Futaba K, Leung WW, Wong C, Mak T, Ng S. Novel Fecobionics defecatory Function Testing. Clinical and Translational Gastroenterology 2019;10:e00108. https://doi.org/10.14309/ctg.0000000000000108.

== Honors and awards ==
- Walton Award. Science Foundation Ireland 2007.
- The Masters Award for Basic Science. The American Gastroenterological Association 2008
- China National Expert Award. China 2013
- The National Friendship Award. China 2014.
- American Gastroenterology Association Fellow, 2018, USA (https://gastro.org/aga-leadership/initiatives-and-programs/aga-fellows-program/current-aga-fellows/).
