= Baku Convention Center =

Baku Convention Center Bakı Konqres Mərkəzi
- Bakı Konqres Mərkəzi
- Baku Convention Center (April 2015)
- Interactive map of the Baku Convention Center; Bakı Konqres Mərkəzi area

General information
- Status: Completed
- Location: Baku, Azerbaijan, Tabriz street 130
- Coordinates: 40°23′43″N 49°52′01″E
- Construction started: 2013
- Completed: 29 August 2015

Design and construction
- Architects: COOP HIMMELB(L)AU Wolf D. Prix & Partner ZT GmbH
- Main contractor: ILK Construction

Other information
- Seating capacity: 6,000

Website
- www.bakuconventioncenter.com

Baku Convention Center is a multifunction complex located close to the city center of Baku.

The congress center has 17 conference halls with a total capacity of up to 2,500 people.

== Construction ==
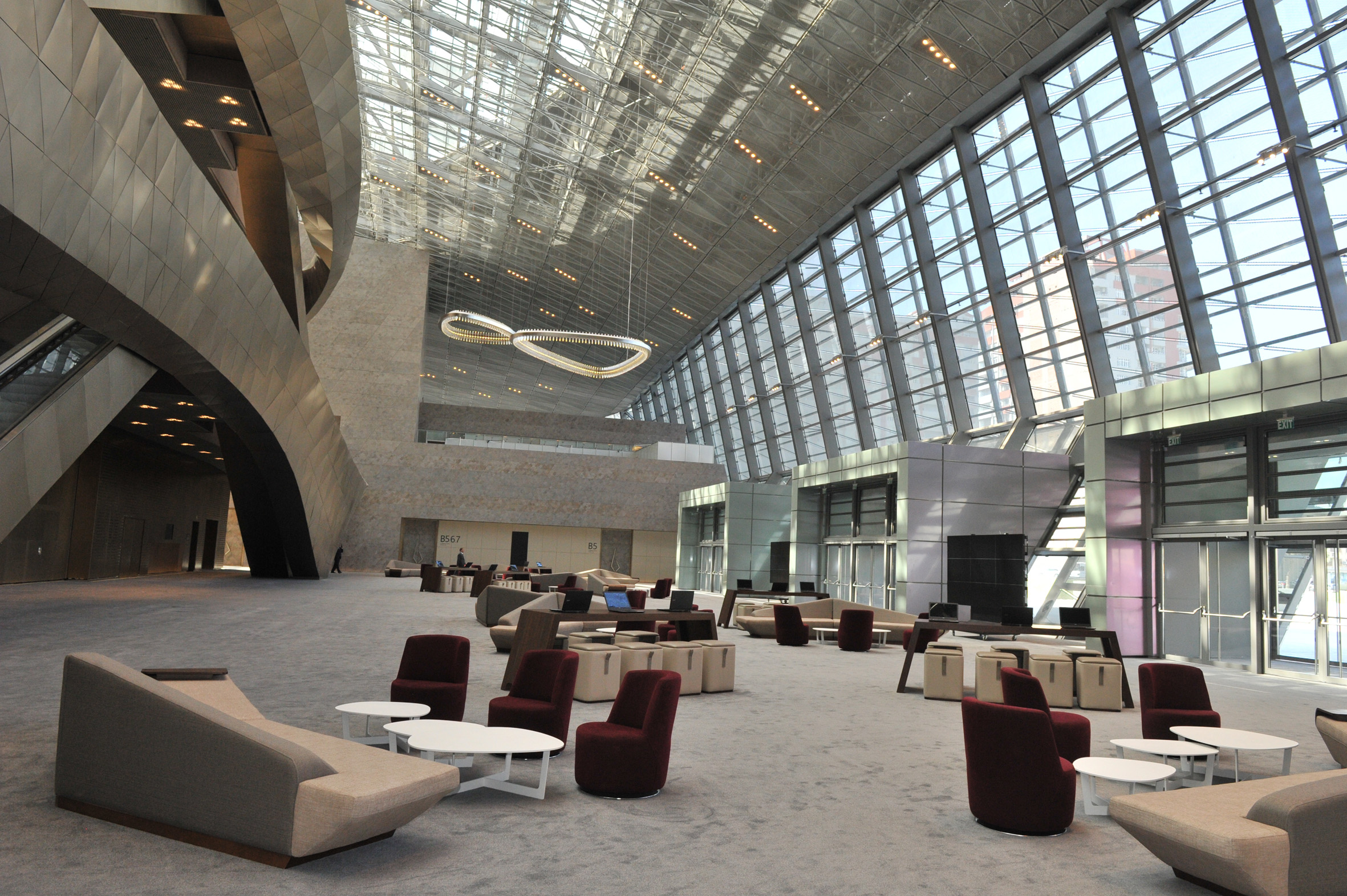
The rear Center lobby (April 2015)

Construction of the Baku Convention Center began in February, 2014 and was completed in 2015. The center covers a total area of 6.2 hectares (15.3 acres). The area of 46,600 square metres (502,000 sq ft) of the Center is under construction.

The Center building includes 17 conference halls with a total capacity of 2,500 people and a restaurant that can serve 1,500 guests.

== History ==
The opening ceremony of the Baku Convention Center was held on 29 April 2015 with the participation of President Ilham Aliyev, his wife Mehriban Aliyeva and daughter Arzu Aliyeva. Finance Minister Samir Sharifov gave information about the building.

The first international event that Baku Convention Center hosted on May 2-5 was the 48th annual meeting of the Board of Directors of the Asian Development Bank.

It hosted the 41st World Scout Conference on August 15, 2017. It hosted the 18th Mid-Term Ministerial Conference of the Non-Aligned Movement (NAM).

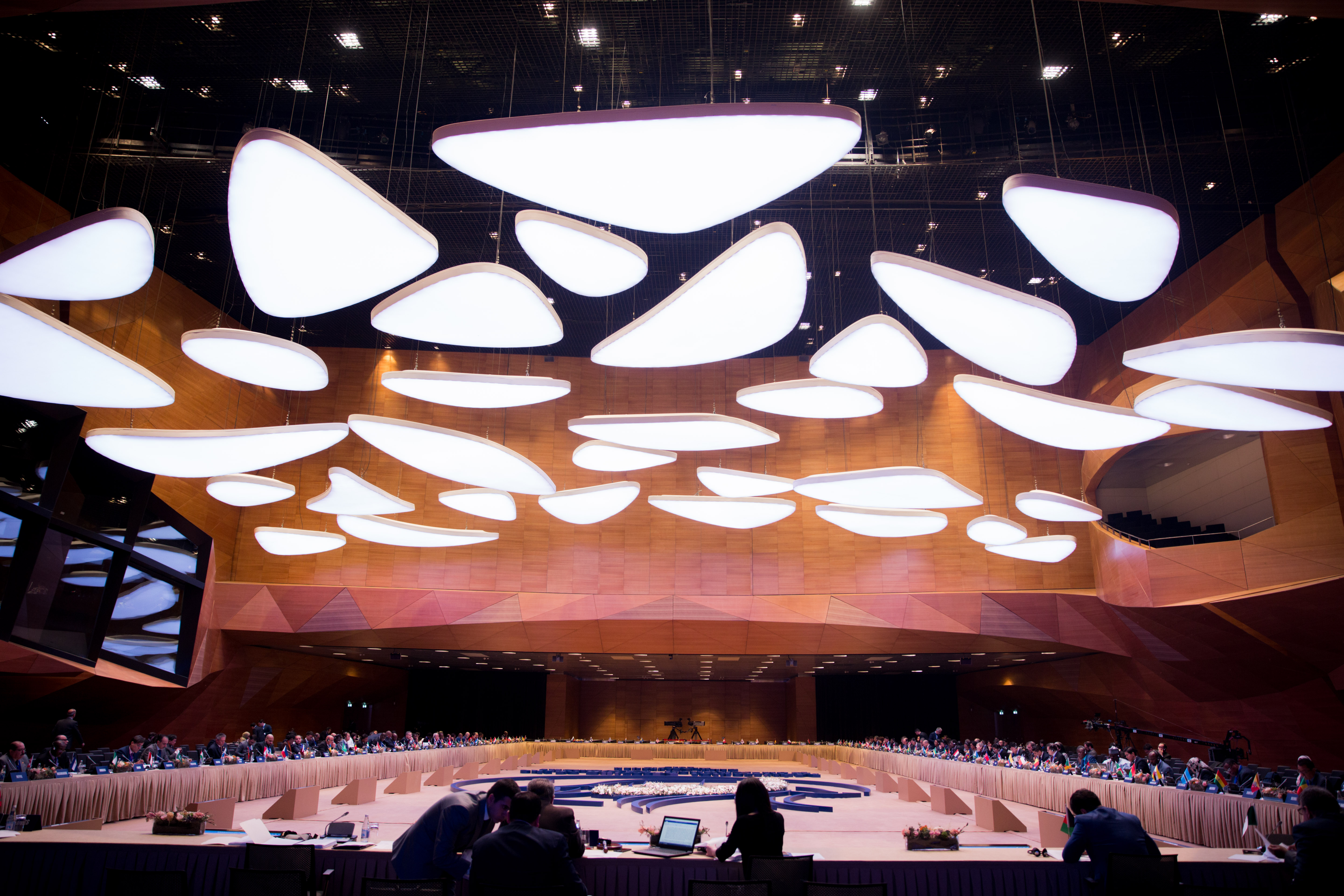
18th Mid-Term Ministerial Conference of the Non-Aligned Movement

== Project team ==
The project was designed by Coop Himmelb(l)au Wolf D. Prix & Partner ZT GmbH. Project leader is Christian Labud, Günther Weber, architect is Martin Jelinek, design architect is Alexander Ott, coordinators are Maria Nardelli Donna Riedel.
